

451001–451100 

|-bgcolor=#fefefe
| 451001 ||  || — || October 8, 2008 || Kitt Peak || Spacewatch || — || align=right data-sort-value="0.62" | 620 m || 
|-id=002 bgcolor=#fefefe
| 451002 ||  || — || October 10, 2008 || Mount Lemmon || Mount Lemmon Survey || — || align=right data-sort-value="0.77" | 770 m || 
|-id=003 bgcolor=#FFC2E0
| 451003 ||  || — || October 21, 2008 || Mount Lemmon || Mount Lemmon Survey || APOPHA || align=right data-sort-value="0.47" | 470 m || 
|-id=004 bgcolor=#fefefe
| 451004 ||  || — || September 9, 2008 || Mount Lemmon || Mount Lemmon Survey || V || align=right data-sort-value="0.48" | 480 m || 
|-id=005 bgcolor=#fefefe
| 451005 ||  || — || October 20, 2008 || Kitt Peak || Spacewatch || MAS || align=right data-sort-value="0.75" | 750 m || 
|-id=006 bgcolor=#fefefe
| 451006 ||  || — || October 20, 2008 || Kitt Peak || Spacewatch || — || align=right data-sort-value="0.82" | 820 m || 
|-id=007 bgcolor=#fefefe
| 451007 ||  || — || October 20, 2008 || Kitt Peak || Spacewatch || — || align=right data-sort-value="0.55" | 550 m || 
|-id=008 bgcolor=#fefefe
| 451008 ||  || — || October 21, 2008 || Kitt Peak || Spacewatch || — || align=right data-sort-value="0.63" | 630 m || 
|-id=009 bgcolor=#fefefe
| 451009 ||  || — || September 28, 2008 || Mount Lemmon || Mount Lemmon Survey || — || align=right data-sort-value="0.93" | 930 m || 
|-id=010 bgcolor=#fefefe
| 451010 ||  || — || October 21, 2008 || Kitt Peak || Spacewatch || — || align=right data-sort-value="0.57" | 570 m || 
|-id=011 bgcolor=#fefefe
| 451011 ||  || — || October 22, 2008 || Kitt Peak || Spacewatch || — || align=right data-sort-value="0.78" | 780 m || 
|-id=012 bgcolor=#fefefe
| 451012 ||  || — || October 26, 2008 || Socorro || LINEAR || — || align=right | 1.3 km || 
|-id=013 bgcolor=#fefefe
| 451013 ||  || — || October 23, 2008 || Kitt Peak || Spacewatch || — || align=right data-sort-value="0.71" | 710 m || 
|-id=014 bgcolor=#fefefe
| 451014 ||  || — || October 23, 2008 || Kitt Peak || Spacewatch || (2076) || align=right data-sort-value="0.86" | 860 m || 
|-id=015 bgcolor=#fefefe
| 451015 ||  || — || October 24, 2008 || Kitt Peak || Spacewatch || — || align=right data-sort-value="0.58" | 580 m || 
|-id=016 bgcolor=#fefefe
| 451016 ||  || — || October 24, 2008 || Kitt Peak || Spacewatch || — || align=right data-sort-value="0.71" | 710 m || 
|-id=017 bgcolor=#fefefe
| 451017 ||  || — || October 25, 2008 || Kitt Peak || Spacewatch || — || align=right | 1.0 km || 
|-id=018 bgcolor=#fefefe
| 451018 ||  || — || October 26, 2008 || Kitt Peak || Spacewatch || V || align=right data-sort-value="0.52" | 520 m || 
|-id=019 bgcolor=#fefefe
| 451019 ||  || — || October 28, 2008 || Kitt Peak || Spacewatch || — || align=right data-sort-value="0.70" | 700 m || 
|-id=020 bgcolor=#fefefe
| 451020 ||  || — || October 20, 2008 || Kitt Peak || Spacewatch || — || align=right data-sort-value="0.50" | 500 m || 
|-id=021 bgcolor=#fefefe
| 451021 ||  || — || October 24, 2008 || Catalina || CSS || — || align=right data-sort-value="0.82" | 820 m || 
|-id=022 bgcolor=#fefefe
| 451022 ||  || — || November 2, 2008 || Mount Lemmon || Mount Lemmon Survey || — || align=right data-sort-value="0.62" | 620 m || 
|-id=023 bgcolor=#fefefe
| 451023 ||  || — || October 26, 2008 || Kitt Peak || Spacewatch || V || align=right data-sort-value="0.66" | 660 m || 
|-id=024 bgcolor=#fefefe
| 451024 ||  || — || November 6, 2008 || Kitt Peak || Spacewatch || — || align=right data-sort-value="0.94" | 940 m || 
|-id=025 bgcolor=#fefefe
| 451025 ||  || — || November 17, 2008 || Kitt Peak || Spacewatch || — || align=right data-sort-value="0.59" | 590 m || 
|-id=026 bgcolor=#fefefe
| 451026 ||  || — || November 6, 2008 || Catalina || CSS || — || align=right data-sort-value="0.67" | 670 m || 
|-id=027 bgcolor=#fefefe
| 451027 ||  || — || November 7, 2008 || Mount Lemmon || Mount Lemmon Survey || — || align=right data-sort-value="0.94" | 940 m || 
|-id=028 bgcolor=#fefefe
| 451028 ||  || — || November 18, 2008 || Kitt Peak || Spacewatch || — || align=right data-sort-value="0.65" | 650 m || 
|-id=029 bgcolor=#fefefe
| 451029 ||  || — || November 20, 2008 || Kitt Peak || Spacewatch || — || align=right data-sort-value="0.73" | 730 m || 
|-id=030 bgcolor=#fefefe
| 451030 ||  || — || November 20, 2008 || Kitt Peak || Spacewatch || NYS || align=right data-sort-value="0.47" | 470 m || 
|-id=031 bgcolor=#fefefe
| 451031 ||  || — || November 1, 2008 || Mount Lemmon || Mount Lemmon Survey || V || align=right data-sort-value="0.73" | 730 m || 
|-id=032 bgcolor=#fefefe
| 451032 ||  || — || September 25, 2008 || Mount Lemmon || Mount Lemmon Survey || MAS || align=right data-sort-value="0.90" | 900 m || 
|-id=033 bgcolor=#fefefe
| 451033 ||  || — || November 30, 2008 || Kitt Peak || Spacewatch || NYS || align=right data-sort-value="0.66" | 660 m || 
|-id=034 bgcolor=#fefefe
| 451034 ||  || — || October 23, 2008 || Kitt Peak || Spacewatch || — || align=right data-sort-value="0.75" | 750 m || 
|-id=035 bgcolor=#fefefe
| 451035 ||  || — || November 30, 2008 || Kitt Peak || Spacewatch || — || align=right data-sort-value="0.65" | 650 m || 
|-id=036 bgcolor=#fefefe
| 451036 ||  || — || November 18, 2008 || Catalina || CSS || (2076) || align=right data-sort-value="0.90" | 900 m || 
|-id=037 bgcolor=#fefefe
| 451037 ||  || — || December 2, 2008 || Socorro || LINEAR || — || align=right data-sort-value="0.75" | 750 m || 
|-id=038 bgcolor=#fefefe
| 451038 ||  || — || December 1, 2008 || Kitt Peak || Spacewatch || — || align=right data-sort-value="0.82" | 820 m || 
|-id=039 bgcolor=#fefefe
| 451039 ||  || — || November 19, 2008 || Kitt Peak || Spacewatch || — || align=right data-sort-value="0.78" | 780 m || 
|-id=040 bgcolor=#fefefe
| 451040 ||  || — || December 2, 2008 || Kitt Peak || Spacewatch || NYS || align=right data-sort-value="0.45" | 450 m || 
|-id=041 bgcolor=#fefefe
| 451041 ||  || — || December 4, 2008 || Socorro || LINEAR || — || align=right | 1.6 km || 
|-id=042 bgcolor=#fefefe
| 451042 ||  || — || November 21, 2008 || Mount Lemmon || Mount Lemmon Survey || — || align=right data-sort-value="0.55" | 550 m || 
|-id=043 bgcolor=#FA8072
| 451043 ||  || — || December 19, 2008 || Socorro || LINEAR || — || align=right | 1.0 km || 
|-id=044 bgcolor=#fefefe
| 451044 ||  || — || September 29, 2008 || Mount Lemmon || Mount Lemmon Survey || — || align=right data-sort-value="0.86" | 860 m || 
|-id=045 bgcolor=#fefefe
| 451045 ||  || — || November 24, 2008 || Mount Lemmon || Mount Lemmon Survey || — || align=right | 1.1 km || 
|-id=046 bgcolor=#fefefe
| 451046 ||  || — || November 21, 2008 || Kitt Peak || Spacewatch || — || align=right data-sort-value="0.74" | 740 m || 
|-id=047 bgcolor=#fefefe
| 451047 ||  || — || December 31, 2008 || Kitt Peak || Spacewatch || MAS || align=right data-sort-value="0.75" | 750 m || 
|-id=048 bgcolor=#fefefe
| 451048 ||  || — || December 21, 2008 || Kitt Peak || Spacewatch || — || align=right data-sort-value="0.68" | 680 m || 
|-id=049 bgcolor=#fefefe
| 451049 ||  || — || December 29, 2008 || Kitt Peak || Spacewatch || — || align=right data-sort-value="0.62" | 620 m || 
|-id=050 bgcolor=#fefefe
| 451050 ||  || — || December 21, 2008 || Kitt Peak || Spacewatch || — || align=right data-sort-value="0.81" | 810 m || 
|-id=051 bgcolor=#fefefe
| 451051 ||  || — || December 29, 2008 || Kitt Peak || Spacewatch || — || align=right data-sort-value="0.71" | 710 m || 
|-id=052 bgcolor=#fefefe
| 451052 ||  || — || November 24, 2008 || Mount Lemmon || Mount Lemmon Survey || — || align=right data-sort-value="0.61" | 610 m || 
|-id=053 bgcolor=#fefefe
| 451053 ||  || — || November 21, 2008 || Mount Lemmon || Mount Lemmon Survey || — || align=right data-sort-value="0.61" | 610 m || 
|-id=054 bgcolor=#fefefe
| 451054 ||  || — || December 29, 2008 || Kitt Peak || Spacewatch || — || align=right data-sort-value="0.82" | 820 m || 
|-id=055 bgcolor=#fefefe
| 451055 ||  || — || December 31, 2008 || Kitt Peak || Spacewatch || — || align=right data-sort-value="0.65" | 650 m || 
|-id=056 bgcolor=#d6d6d6
| 451056 ||  || — || December 31, 2008 || Kitt Peak || Spacewatch || 3:2 || align=right | 4.5 km || 
|-id=057 bgcolor=#fefefe
| 451057 ||  || — || November 21, 2008 || Mount Lemmon || Mount Lemmon Survey || V || align=right data-sort-value="0.68" | 680 m || 
|-id=058 bgcolor=#fefefe
| 451058 ||  || — || December 30, 2008 || Kitt Peak || Spacewatch || — || align=right data-sort-value="0.78" | 780 m || 
|-id=059 bgcolor=#fefefe
| 451059 ||  || — || December 30, 2008 || La Sagra || OAM Obs. || — || align=right data-sort-value="0.88" | 880 m || 
|-id=060 bgcolor=#fefefe
| 451060 ||  || — || December 22, 2008 || Kitt Peak || Spacewatch || MAS || align=right data-sort-value="0.71" | 710 m || 
|-id=061 bgcolor=#fefefe
| 451061 ||  || — || December 22, 2008 || Kitt Peak || Spacewatch || V || align=right data-sort-value="0.67" | 670 m || 
|-id=062 bgcolor=#fefefe
| 451062 ||  || — || December 30, 2008 || Mount Lemmon || Mount Lemmon Survey || — || align=right data-sort-value="0.95" | 950 m || 
|-id=063 bgcolor=#fefefe
| 451063 ||  || — || December 22, 2008 || Mount Lemmon || Mount Lemmon Survey || NYS || align=right data-sort-value="0.66" | 660 m || 
|-id=064 bgcolor=#fefefe
| 451064 ||  || — || December 22, 2008 || Mount Lemmon || Mount Lemmon Survey || MAS || align=right data-sort-value="0.71" | 710 m || 
|-id=065 bgcolor=#fefefe
| 451065 ||  || — || October 9, 2004 || Kitt Peak || Spacewatch || — || align=right data-sort-value="0.65" | 650 m || 
|-id=066 bgcolor=#fefefe
| 451066 ||  || — || January 3, 2009 || Kitt Peak || Spacewatch || — || align=right data-sort-value="0.78" | 780 m || 
|-id=067 bgcolor=#E9E9E9
| 451067 ||  || — || December 22, 2008 || Kitt Peak || Spacewatch || ADE || align=right | 2.1 km || 
|-id=068 bgcolor=#fefefe
| 451068 ||  || — || January 2, 2009 || Kitt Peak || Spacewatch || CLA || align=right | 1.6 km || 
|-id=069 bgcolor=#fefefe
| 451069 ||  || — || January 15, 2009 || Kitt Peak || Spacewatch || — || align=right data-sort-value="0.81" | 810 m || 
|-id=070 bgcolor=#fefefe
| 451070 ||  || — || January 16, 2009 || Kitt Peak || Spacewatch || MAS || align=right data-sort-value="0.54" | 540 m || 
|-id=071 bgcolor=#fefefe
| 451071 ||  || — || December 22, 2008 || Kitt Peak || Spacewatch || — || align=right data-sort-value="0.78" | 780 m || 
|-id=072 bgcolor=#fefefe
| 451072 ||  || — || December 31, 2008 || Mount Lemmon || Mount Lemmon Survey || — || align=right data-sort-value="0.90" | 900 m || 
|-id=073 bgcolor=#fefefe
| 451073 ||  || — || December 29, 2008 || Kitt Peak || Spacewatch || NYS || align=right data-sort-value="0.72" | 720 m || 
|-id=074 bgcolor=#fefefe
| 451074 ||  || — || January 16, 2009 || Kitt Peak || Spacewatch || MAS || align=right data-sort-value="0.59" | 590 m || 
|-id=075 bgcolor=#fefefe
| 451075 ||  || — || January 16, 2009 || Kitt Peak || Spacewatch || NYS || align=right data-sort-value="0.58" | 580 m || 
|-id=076 bgcolor=#fefefe
| 451076 ||  || — || January 16, 2009 || Kitt Peak || Spacewatch || NYS || align=right data-sort-value="0.62" | 620 m || 
|-id=077 bgcolor=#fefefe
| 451077 ||  || — || January 20, 2009 || Kitt Peak || Spacewatch || — || align=right data-sort-value="0.94" | 940 m || 
|-id=078 bgcolor=#fefefe
| 451078 ||  || — || January 20, 2009 || Kitt Peak || Spacewatch || H || align=right data-sort-value="0.60" | 600 m || 
|-id=079 bgcolor=#fefefe
| 451079 ||  || — || January 25, 2009 || Catalina || CSS || — || align=right data-sort-value="0.66" | 660 m || 
|-id=080 bgcolor=#fefefe
| 451080 ||  || — || January 25, 2009 || Kitt Peak || Spacewatch || MAS || align=right data-sort-value="0.63" | 630 m || 
|-id=081 bgcolor=#fefefe
| 451081 ||  || — || January 25, 2009 || Kitt Peak || Spacewatch || — || align=right data-sort-value="0.75" | 750 m || 
|-id=082 bgcolor=#fefefe
| 451082 ||  || — || December 29, 2008 || Mount Lemmon || Mount Lemmon Survey || — || align=right data-sort-value="0.75" | 750 m || 
|-id=083 bgcolor=#fefefe
| 451083 ||  || — || December 22, 2008 || Kitt Peak || Spacewatch || — || align=right data-sort-value="0.71" | 710 m || 
|-id=084 bgcolor=#fefefe
| 451084 ||  || — || January 28, 2009 || Catalina || CSS || — || align=right data-sort-value="0.89" | 890 m || 
|-id=085 bgcolor=#fefefe
| 451085 ||  || — || December 31, 2008 || Kitt Peak || Spacewatch || — || align=right data-sort-value="0.62" | 620 m || 
|-id=086 bgcolor=#fefefe
| 451086 ||  || — || January 20, 2009 || Kitt Peak || Spacewatch || NYS || align=right data-sort-value="0.62" | 620 m || 
|-id=087 bgcolor=#fefefe
| 451087 ||  || — || January 29, 2009 || Kitt Peak || Spacewatch || — || align=right data-sort-value="0.78" | 780 m || 
|-id=088 bgcolor=#E9E9E9
| 451088 ||  || — || January 30, 2009 || Kitt Peak || Spacewatch || — || align=right | 1.1 km || 
|-id=089 bgcolor=#fefefe
| 451089 ||  || — || January 30, 2009 || Kitt Peak || Spacewatch || — || align=right data-sort-value="0.83" | 830 m || 
|-id=090 bgcolor=#fefefe
| 451090 ||  || — || December 9, 2004 || Kitt Peak || Spacewatch || — || align=right data-sort-value="0.67" | 670 m || 
|-id=091 bgcolor=#E9E9E9
| 451091 ||  || — || January 29, 2009 || Mount Lemmon || Mount Lemmon Survey || MAR || align=right data-sort-value="0.96" | 960 m || 
|-id=092 bgcolor=#FA8072
| 451092 ||  || — || January 30, 2009 || Catalina || CSS || — || align=right data-sort-value="0.81" | 810 m || 
|-id=093 bgcolor=#E9E9E9
| 451093 ||  || — || December 29, 2008 || Kitt Peak || Spacewatch || — || align=right data-sort-value="0.94" | 940 m || 
|-id=094 bgcolor=#fefefe
| 451094 ||  || — || January 18, 2009 || Kitt Peak || Spacewatch || — || align=right data-sort-value="0.82" | 820 m || 
|-id=095 bgcolor=#fefefe
| 451095 ||  || — || February 1, 2009 || Kitt Peak || Spacewatch || — || align=right data-sort-value="0.74" | 740 m || 
|-id=096 bgcolor=#fefefe
| 451096 ||  || — || February 1, 2009 || Kitt Peak || Spacewatch || NYS || align=right data-sort-value="0.71" | 710 m || 
|-id=097 bgcolor=#fefefe
| 451097 ||  || — || October 2, 2000 || Socorro || LINEAR || — || align=right data-sort-value="0.96" | 960 m || 
|-id=098 bgcolor=#E9E9E9
| 451098 ||  || — || January 20, 2009 || Kitt Peak || Spacewatch || — || align=right data-sort-value="0.91" | 910 m || 
|-id=099 bgcolor=#E9E9E9
| 451099 ||  || — || February 14, 2009 || Kitt Peak || Spacewatch || — || align=right | 1.3 km || 
|-id=100 bgcolor=#fefefe
| 451100 ||  || — || February 13, 2009 || Kitt Peak || Spacewatch || MAS || align=right data-sort-value="0.63" | 630 m || 
|}

451101–451200 

|-bgcolor=#E9E9E9
| 451101 ||  || — || January 17, 2009 || Kitt Peak || Spacewatch || EUN || align=right | 1.0 km || 
|-id=102 bgcolor=#fefefe
| 451102 ||  || — || January 15, 2009 || Kitt Peak || Spacewatch || — || align=right data-sort-value="0.86" | 860 m || 
|-id=103 bgcolor=#E9E9E9
| 451103 ||  || — || January 31, 2009 || Kitt Peak || Spacewatch || — || align=right data-sort-value="0.89" | 890 m || 
|-id=104 bgcolor=#E9E9E9
| 451104 ||  || — || February 27, 2009 || Kitt Peak || Spacewatch || WIT || align=right | 1.1 km || 
|-id=105 bgcolor=#fefefe
| 451105 ||  || — || March 15, 2009 || Kitt Peak || Spacewatch || — || align=right data-sort-value="0.65" | 650 m || 
|-id=106 bgcolor=#fefefe
| 451106 ||  || — || January 17, 2005 || Kitt Peak || Spacewatch || — || align=right data-sort-value="0.77" | 770 m || 
|-id=107 bgcolor=#E9E9E9
| 451107 ||  || — || March 3, 2009 || Kitt Peak || Spacewatch || — || align=right | 2.9 km || 
|-id=108 bgcolor=#E9E9E9
| 451108 ||  || — || March 15, 2009 || Kitt Peak || Spacewatch || — || align=right data-sort-value="0.88" | 880 m || 
|-id=109 bgcolor=#E9E9E9
| 451109 ||  || — || March 17, 2009 || Kitt Peak || Spacewatch || — || align=right data-sort-value="0.83" | 830 m || 
|-id=110 bgcolor=#E9E9E9
| 451110 ||  || — || March 20, 2009 || La Sagra || OAM Obs. || — || align=right | 2.7 km || 
|-id=111 bgcolor=#fefefe
| 451111 ||  || — || March 21, 2009 || La Sagra || OAM Obs. || — || align=right data-sort-value="0.75" | 750 m || 
|-id=112 bgcolor=#fefefe
| 451112 ||  || — || March 26, 2009 || Mount Lemmon || Mount Lemmon Survey || — || align=right data-sort-value="0.71" | 710 m || 
|-id=113 bgcolor=#E9E9E9
| 451113 ||  || — || March 17, 2009 || Kitt Peak || Spacewatch || — || align=right | 1.9 km || 
|-id=114 bgcolor=#E9E9E9
| 451114 ||  || — || March 17, 2009 || Kitt Peak || Spacewatch || MAR || align=right | 1.2 km || 
|-id=115 bgcolor=#E9E9E9
| 451115 ||  || — || March 1, 2009 || Catalina || CSS || — || align=right | 1.6 km || 
|-id=116 bgcolor=#E9E9E9
| 451116 ||  || — || April 2, 2009 || Kitt Peak || Spacewatch || — || align=right | 1.5 km || 
|-id=117 bgcolor=#E9E9E9
| 451117 ||  || — || March 17, 2009 || Kitt Peak || Spacewatch || — || align=right | 1.5 km || 
|-id=118 bgcolor=#E9E9E9
| 451118 ||  || — || April 20, 2009 || Kitt Peak || Spacewatch || — || align=right | 1.1 km || 
|-id=119 bgcolor=#FA8072
| 451119 ||  || — || April 22, 2009 || La Sagra || OAM Obs. || H || align=right data-sort-value="0.71" | 710 m || 
|-id=120 bgcolor=#E9E9E9
| 451120 ||  || — || April 30, 2009 || Kitt Peak || Spacewatch || — || align=right | 1.0 km || 
|-id=121 bgcolor=#E9E9E9
| 451121 ||  || — || April 17, 2009 || Kitt Peak || Spacewatch || — || align=right | 1.8 km || 
|-id=122 bgcolor=#E9E9E9
| 451122 ||  || — || April 29, 2009 || Kitt Peak || Spacewatch || — || align=right | 1.3 km || 
|-id=123 bgcolor=#E9E9E9
| 451123 ||  || — || May 14, 2009 || Kitt Peak || Spacewatch || — || align=right | 1.9 km || 
|-id=124 bgcolor=#FFC2E0
| 451124 ||  || — || May 23, 2009 || Siding Spring || SSS || APO +1kmPHAcritical || align=right | 2.2 km || 
|-id=125 bgcolor=#E9E9E9
| 451125 ||  || — || May 25, 2009 || Tiki || N. Teamo || — || align=right | 3.0 km || 
|-id=126 bgcolor=#fefefe
| 451126 ||  || — || May 25, 2009 || Kitt Peak || Spacewatch || H || align=right data-sort-value="0.71" | 710 m || 
|-id=127 bgcolor=#E9E9E9
| 451127 ||  || — || May 1, 2009 || Mount Lemmon || Mount Lemmon Survey || — || align=right data-sort-value="0.98" | 980 m || 
|-id=128 bgcolor=#E9E9E9
| 451128 ||  || — || September 19, 2001 || Socorro || LINEAR || — || align=right | 2.4 km || 
|-id=129 bgcolor=#d6d6d6
| 451129 ||  || — || June 23, 2009 || Mount Lemmon || Mount Lemmon Survey || — || align=right | 2.6 km || 
|-id=130 bgcolor=#d6d6d6
| 451130 ||  || — || July 2, 2009 || La Sagra || OAM Obs. || — || align=right | 3.3 km || 
|-id=131 bgcolor=#d6d6d6
| 451131 ||  || — || July 28, 2009 || Kitt Peak || Spacewatch || — || align=right | 2.5 km || 
|-id=132 bgcolor=#d6d6d6
| 451132 ||  || — || July 27, 2009 || Catalina || CSS || — || align=right | 5.0 km || 
|-id=133 bgcolor=#d6d6d6
| 451133 ||  || — || August 15, 2009 || Catalina || CSS || — || align=right | 3.5 km || 
|-id=134 bgcolor=#d6d6d6
| 451134 ||  || — || August 16, 2009 || Kitt Peak || Spacewatch || — || align=right | 2.4 km || 
|-id=135 bgcolor=#d6d6d6
| 451135 ||  || — || August 23, 2009 || Bisei SG Center || BATTeRS || — || align=right | 4.0 km || 
|-id=136 bgcolor=#d6d6d6
| 451136 ||  || — || August 21, 2009 || Socorro || LINEAR || — || align=right | 3.2 km || 
|-id=137 bgcolor=#d6d6d6
| 451137 ||  || — || August 20, 2009 || La Sagra || OAM Obs. || — || align=right | 2.5 km || 
|-id=138 bgcolor=#d6d6d6
| 451138 Rizvanov ||  ||  || August 29, 2009 || Zelenchukskaya || T. V. Kryachko || EOS || align=right | 2.1 km || 
|-id=139 bgcolor=#d6d6d6
| 451139 ||  || — || August 15, 2009 || Kitt Peak || Spacewatch || — || align=right | 2.7 km || 
|-id=140 bgcolor=#d6d6d6
| 451140 ||  || — || August 27, 2009 || Kitt Peak || Spacewatch || — || align=right | 2.2 km || 
|-id=141 bgcolor=#d6d6d6
| 451141 ||  || — || August 29, 2009 || Kitt Peak || Spacewatch || — || align=right | 2.5 km || 
|-id=142 bgcolor=#d6d6d6
| 451142 ||  || — || August 31, 2009 || Siding Spring || SSS || — || align=right | 3.9 km || 
|-id=143 bgcolor=#d6d6d6
| 451143 ||  || — || August 16, 2009 || Catalina || CSS || — || align=right | 3.6 km || 
|-id=144 bgcolor=#d6d6d6
| 451144 ||  || — || August 26, 2009 || Socorro || LINEAR || — || align=right | 4.1 km || 
|-id=145 bgcolor=#d6d6d6
| 451145 ||  || — || August 28, 2009 || Kitt Peak || Spacewatch || — || align=right | 2.1 km || 
|-id=146 bgcolor=#d6d6d6
| 451146 ||  || — || August 17, 2009 || Catalina || CSS || — || align=right | 2.5 km || 
|-id=147 bgcolor=#d6d6d6
| 451147 ||  || — || September 12, 2009 || Kitt Peak || Spacewatch || — || align=right | 3.2 km || 
|-id=148 bgcolor=#d6d6d6
| 451148 ||  || — || September 12, 2009 || Kitt Peak || Spacewatch || — || align=right | 3.3 km || 
|-id=149 bgcolor=#d6d6d6
| 451149 ||  || — || September 12, 2009 || Kitt Peak || Spacewatch || — || align=right | 3.0 km || 
|-id=150 bgcolor=#d6d6d6
| 451150 ||  || — || September 15, 2009 || Kitt Peak || Spacewatch || EOS || align=right | 1.8 km || 
|-id=151 bgcolor=#d6d6d6
| 451151 ||  || — || September 16, 2009 || Kitt Peak || Spacewatch || THM || align=right | 3.2 km || 
|-id=152 bgcolor=#d6d6d6
| 451152 ||  || — || August 23, 2004 || Kitt Peak || Spacewatch || — || align=right | 2.2 km || 
|-id=153 bgcolor=#d6d6d6
| 451153 ||  || — || September 16, 2009 || Kitt Peak || Spacewatch || — || align=right | 2.2 km || 
|-id=154 bgcolor=#d6d6d6
| 451154 ||  || — || September 16, 2009 || Kitt Peak || Spacewatch || EOS || align=right | 2.0 km || 
|-id=155 bgcolor=#d6d6d6
| 451155 ||  || — || September 17, 2009 || Kitt Peak || Spacewatch || — || align=right | 2.7 km || 
|-id=156 bgcolor=#d6d6d6
| 451156 ||  || — || August 27, 2009 || Kitt Peak || Spacewatch || — || align=right | 2.1 km || 
|-id=157 bgcolor=#FFC2E0
| 451157 ||  || — || September 26, 2009 || Mount Lemmon || Mount Lemmon Survey || APOPHA || align=right data-sort-value="0.23" | 230 m || 
|-id=158 bgcolor=#d6d6d6
| 451158 ||  || — || September 18, 2009 || Kitt Peak || Spacewatch || — || align=right | 3.2 km || 
|-id=159 bgcolor=#d6d6d6
| 451159 ||  || — || September 18, 2009 || Kitt Peak || Spacewatch || — || align=right | 2.8 km || 
|-id=160 bgcolor=#d6d6d6
| 451160 ||  || — || January 6, 2006 || Catalina || CSS || — || align=right | 3.9 km || 
|-id=161 bgcolor=#d6d6d6
| 451161 ||  || — || September 18, 2009 || Kitt Peak || Spacewatch || — || align=right | 4.1 km || 
|-id=162 bgcolor=#d6d6d6
| 451162 ||  || — || September 18, 2009 || Kitt Peak || Spacewatch || — || align=right | 2.3 km || 
|-id=163 bgcolor=#d6d6d6
| 451163 ||  || — || September 19, 2009 || Kitt Peak || Spacewatch || — || align=right | 4.7 km || 
|-id=164 bgcolor=#d6d6d6
| 451164 ||  || — || September 20, 2009 || Kitt Peak || Spacewatch || — || align=right | 2.4 km || 
|-id=165 bgcolor=#d6d6d6
| 451165 ||  || — || November 20, 2004 || Kitt Peak || Spacewatch || — || align=right | 3.5 km || 
|-id=166 bgcolor=#d6d6d6
| 451166 ||  || — || September 21, 2009 || Mount Lemmon || Mount Lemmon Survey || — || align=right | 3.1 km || 
|-id=167 bgcolor=#d6d6d6
| 451167 ||  || — || September 21, 2009 || Mount Lemmon || Mount Lemmon Survey || EOS || align=right | 1.6 km || 
|-id=168 bgcolor=#d6d6d6
| 451168 ||  || — || September 15, 2009 || Kitt Peak || Spacewatch || — || align=right | 2.6 km || 
|-id=169 bgcolor=#d6d6d6
| 451169 ||  || — || September 24, 2009 || Kitt Peak || Spacewatch || — || align=right | 2.4 km || 
|-id=170 bgcolor=#d6d6d6
| 451170 ||  || — || September 24, 2009 || Kitt Peak || Spacewatch || — || align=right | 2.5 km || 
|-id=171 bgcolor=#d6d6d6
| 451171 ||  || — || September 17, 2009 || Kitt Peak || Spacewatch || — || align=right | 2.1 km || 
|-id=172 bgcolor=#d6d6d6
| 451172 ||  || — || September 22, 2009 || Kitt Peak || Spacewatch || — || align=right | 2.8 km || 
|-id=173 bgcolor=#d6d6d6
| 451173 ||  || — || September 21, 2009 || Mount Lemmon || Mount Lemmon Survey || — || align=right | 2.2 km || 
|-id=174 bgcolor=#d6d6d6
| 451174 ||  || — || September 24, 2009 || Kitt Peak || Spacewatch || — || align=right | 2.4 km || 
|-id=175 bgcolor=#d6d6d6
| 451175 ||  || — || September 12, 2009 || Kitt Peak || Spacewatch || THM || align=right | 1.9 km || 
|-id=176 bgcolor=#d6d6d6
| 451176 ||  || — || September 24, 2009 || Mount Lemmon || Mount Lemmon Survey || — || align=right | 2.5 km || 
|-id=177 bgcolor=#d6d6d6
| 451177 ||  || — || September 25, 2009 || Kitt Peak || Spacewatch || — || align=right | 2.4 km || 
|-id=178 bgcolor=#d6d6d6
| 451178 ||  || — || August 27, 2009 || Kitt Peak || Spacewatch || THMcritical || align=right | 1.6 km || 
|-id=179 bgcolor=#d6d6d6
| 451179 ||  || — || September 18, 2009 || Kitt Peak || Spacewatch || — || align=right | 2.8 km || 
|-id=180 bgcolor=#d6d6d6
| 451180 ||  || — || September 25, 2009 || Kitt Peak || Spacewatch || — || align=right | 3.4 km || 
|-id=181 bgcolor=#d6d6d6
| 451181 ||  || — || August 28, 2009 || Kitt Peak || Spacewatch || — || align=right | 2.5 km || 
|-id=182 bgcolor=#d6d6d6
| 451182 ||  || — || August 16, 2009 || Kitt Peak || Spacewatch || — || align=right | 2.5 km || 
|-id=183 bgcolor=#d6d6d6
| 451183 ||  || — || September 12, 2009 || Kitt Peak || Spacewatch || — || align=right | 2.8 km || 
|-id=184 bgcolor=#d6d6d6
| 451184 ||  || — || August 18, 2009 || Kitt Peak || Spacewatch || — || align=right | 2.9 km || 
|-id=185 bgcolor=#d6d6d6
| 451185 ||  || — || March 14, 2007 || Mount Lemmon || Mount Lemmon Survey || — || align=right | 2.6 km || 
|-id=186 bgcolor=#d6d6d6
| 451186 ||  || — || September 26, 2009 || Kitt Peak || Spacewatch || — || align=right | 2.8 km || 
|-id=187 bgcolor=#d6d6d6
| 451187 ||  || — || August 17, 2009 || Catalina || CSS || TIR || align=right | 2.8 km || 
|-id=188 bgcolor=#d6d6d6
| 451188 ||  || — || September 21, 2009 || Catalina || CSS || THB || align=right | 3.4 km || 
|-id=189 bgcolor=#d6d6d6
| 451189 ||  || — || December 18, 2004 || Mount Lemmon || Mount Lemmon Survey || — || align=right | 3.1 km || 
|-id=190 bgcolor=#d6d6d6
| 451190 ||  || — || September 18, 2009 || Kitt Peak || Spacewatch || — || align=right | 2.5 km || 
|-id=191 bgcolor=#d6d6d6
| 451191 ||  || — || March 14, 2007 || Mount Lemmon || Mount Lemmon Survey || — || align=right | 2.9 km || 
|-id=192 bgcolor=#d6d6d6
| 451192 ||  || — || September 28, 2009 || Mount Lemmon || Mount Lemmon Survey || — || align=right | 2.9 km || 
|-id=193 bgcolor=#d6d6d6
| 451193 ||  || — || September 27, 2009 || Kitt Peak || Spacewatch || VER || align=right | 2.3 km || 
|-id=194 bgcolor=#d6d6d6
| 451194 ||  || — || September 16, 2003 || Kitt Peak || Spacewatch || — || align=right | 3.6 km || 
|-id=195 bgcolor=#d6d6d6
| 451195 ||  || — || October 15, 2009 || Catalina || CSS || — || align=right | 4.2 km || 
|-id=196 bgcolor=#d6d6d6
| 451196 ||  || — || August 17, 2009 || Kitt Peak || Spacewatch || — || align=right | 2.8 km || 
|-id=197 bgcolor=#d6d6d6
| 451197 ||  || — || September 15, 2009 || Kitt Peak || Spacewatch || — || align=right | 2.2 km || 
|-id=198 bgcolor=#d6d6d6
| 451198 ||  || — || September 17, 2009 || Kitt Peak || Spacewatch || THM || align=right | 2.1 km || 
|-id=199 bgcolor=#d6d6d6
| 451199 ||  || — || October 16, 2009 || Mount Lemmon || Mount Lemmon Survey || EOS || align=right | 1.7 km || 
|-id=200 bgcolor=#d6d6d6
| 451200 ||  || — || October 20, 2009 || Tzec Maun || J. Sachs || Tj (2.99) || align=right | 5.4 km || 
|}

451201–451300 

|-bgcolor=#d6d6d6
| 451201 ||  || — || October 18, 2009 || Mount Lemmon || Mount Lemmon Survey || — || align=right | 3.2 km || 
|-id=202 bgcolor=#d6d6d6
| 451202 ||  || — || October 23, 2009 || Kitt Peak || Spacewatch || — || align=right | 2.9 km || 
|-id=203 bgcolor=#d6d6d6
| 451203 ||  || — || October 18, 2009 || Catalina || CSS || — || align=right | 4.5 km || 
|-id=204 bgcolor=#d6d6d6
| 451204 ||  || — || September 21, 2009 || Mount Lemmon || Mount Lemmon Survey || — || align=right | 5.2 km || 
|-id=205 bgcolor=#d6d6d6
| 451205 ||  || — || October 23, 2009 || Kitt Peak || Spacewatch || — || align=right | 3.6 km || 
|-id=206 bgcolor=#d6d6d6
| 451206 ||  || — || November 8, 2009 || Mount Lemmon || Mount Lemmon Survey || — || align=right | 3.0 km || 
|-id=207 bgcolor=#d6d6d6
| 451207 ||  || — || November 8, 2009 || Catalina || CSS || — || align=right | 1.3 km || 
|-id=208 bgcolor=#d6d6d6
| 451208 ||  || — || November 9, 2009 || Kitt Peak || Spacewatch || — || align=right | 3.4 km || 
|-id=209 bgcolor=#d6d6d6
| 451209 ||  || — || November 9, 2009 || Catalina || CSS || Tj (2.99) || align=right | 4.9 km || 
|-id=210 bgcolor=#FA8072
| 451210 ||  || — || September 18, 2009 || Catalina || CSS || — || align=right data-sort-value="0.84" | 840 m || 
|-id=211 bgcolor=#d6d6d6
| 451211 ||  || — || November 10, 2009 || Catalina || CSS || Tj (2.98) || align=right | 3.7 km || 
|-id=212 bgcolor=#d6d6d6
| 451212 ||  || — || September 30, 2009 || Mount Lemmon || Mount Lemmon Survey || — || align=right | 3.2 km || 
|-id=213 bgcolor=#d6d6d6
| 451213 ||  || — || November 17, 2009 || Catalina || CSS || Tj (2.99) || align=right | 4.4 km || 
|-id=214 bgcolor=#d6d6d6
| 451214 ||  || — || September 20, 2009 || Mount Lemmon || Mount Lemmon Survey || — || align=right | 2.5 km || 
|-id=215 bgcolor=#d6d6d6
| 451215 ||  || — || November 25, 2009 || Mount Lemmon || Mount Lemmon Survey || 7:4 || align=right | 4.4 km || 
|-id=216 bgcolor=#d6d6d6
| 451216 ||  || — || November 19, 2009 || Mount Lemmon || Mount Lemmon Survey || 7:4* || align=right | 3.4 km || 
|-id=217 bgcolor=#FFC2E0
| 451217 ||  || — || December 10, 2009 || Mount Lemmon || Mount Lemmon Survey || AMO +1km || align=right | 2.7 km || 
|-id=218 bgcolor=#d6d6d6
| 451218 ||  || — || November 27, 2009 || Mount Lemmon || Mount Lemmon Survey || — || align=right | 3.7 km || 
|-id=219 bgcolor=#d6d6d6
| 451219 ||  || — || January 7, 2010 || Kitt Peak || Spacewatch || — || align=right | 3.5 km || 
|-id=220 bgcolor=#d6d6d6
| 451220 ||  || — || September 29, 2009 || Mount Lemmon || Mount Lemmon Survey || LIX || align=right | 2.8 km || 
|-id=221 bgcolor=#d6d6d6
| 451221 ||  || — || January 18, 2010 || WISE || WISE || — || align=right | 3.0 km || 
|-id=222 bgcolor=#fefefe
| 451222 ||  || — || January 22, 2010 || WISE || WISE || — || align=right | 1.7 km || 
|-id=223 bgcolor=#fefefe
| 451223 ||  || — || November 1, 2008 || Kitt Peak || Spacewatch || NYS || align=right data-sort-value="0.92" | 920 m || 
|-id=224 bgcolor=#fefefe
| 451224 ||  || — || September 23, 2008 || Mount Lemmon || Mount Lemmon Survey || (2076) || align=right data-sort-value="0.86" | 860 m || 
|-id=225 bgcolor=#fefefe
| 451225 ||  || — || February 13, 2010 || Mount Lemmon || Mount Lemmon Survey || — || align=right data-sort-value="0.66" | 660 m || 
|-id=226 bgcolor=#fefefe
| 451226 ||  || — || September 4, 2008 || Kitt Peak || Spacewatch || — || align=right data-sort-value="0.75" | 750 m || 
|-id=227 bgcolor=#fefefe
| 451227 ||  || — || March 13, 2007 || Mount Lemmon || Mount Lemmon Survey || — || align=right data-sort-value="0.58" | 580 m || 
|-id=228 bgcolor=#fefefe
| 451228 ||  || — || February 15, 2010 || Kitt Peak || Spacewatch || — || align=right data-sort-value="0.69" | 690 m || 
|-id=229 bgcolor=#fefefe
| 451229 ||  || — || February 15, 2010 || Mount Lemmon || Mount Lemmon Survey || — || align=right data-sort-value="0.88" | 880 m || 
|-id=230 bgcolor=#fefefe
| 451230 ||  || — || February 3, 2010 || WISE || WISE || — || align=right | 3.0 km || 
|-id=231 bgcolor=#fefefe
| 451231 ||  || — || March 12, 2007 || Kitt Peak || Spacewatch || — || align=right data-sort-value="0.79" | 790 m || 
|-id=232 bgcolor=#fefefe
| 451232 ||  || — || February 16, 2010 || Kitt Peak || Spacewatch || — || align=right | 1.4 km || 
|-id=233 bgcolor=#fefefe
| 451233 ||  || — || March 4, 2010 || Kitt Peak || Spacewatch || — || align=right data-sort-value="0.75" | 750 m || 
|-id=234 bgcolor=#fefefe
| 451234 ||  || — || November 1, 2005 || Mount Lemmon || Mount Lemmon Survey || — || align=right data-sort-value="0.71" | 710 m || 
|-id=235 bgcolor=#fefefe
| 451235 ||  || — || February 19, 2010 || Mount Lemmon || Mount Lemmon Survey || — || align=right | 3.1 km || 
|-id=236 bgcolor=#fefefe
| 451236 ||  || — || October 27, 2008 || Mount Lemmon || Mount Lemmon Survey || — || align=right data-sort-value="0.94" | 940 m || 
|-id=237 bgcolor=#fefefe
| 451237 ||  || — || January 5, 2003 || Kitt Peak || Spacewatch || — || align=right data-sort-value="0.75" | 750 m || 
|-id=238 bgcolor=#fefefe
| 451238 ||  || — || March 14, 2010 || Kitt Peak || Spacewatch || — || align=right data-sort-value="0.72" | 720 m || 
|-id=239 bgcolor=#fefefe
| 451239 ||  || — || January 12, 2010 || Catalina || CSS || — || align=right | 1.1 km || 
|-id=240 bgcolor=#fefefe
| 451240 ||  || — || March 17, 2010 || Kitt Peak || Spacewatch || — || align=right data-sort-value="0.69" | 690 m || 
|-id=241 bgcolor=#fefefe
| 451241 ||  || — || April 5, 2010 || Kitt Peak || Spacewatch || — || align=right data-sort-value="0.94" | 940 m || 
|-id=242 bgcolor=#fefefe
| 451242 ||  || — || April 6, 2010 || Mount Lemmon || Mount Lemmon Survey || ERI || align=right | 1.3 km || 
|-id=243 bgcolor=#fefefe
| 451243 ||  || — || March 16, 2010 || Kitt Peak || Spacewatch || — || align=right data-sort-value="0.75" | 750 m || 
|-id=244 bgcolor=#fefefe
| 451244 ||  || — || April 8, 2010 || Kitt Peak || Spacewatch || — || align=right data-sort-value="0.79" | 790 m || 
|-id=245 bgcolor=#fefefe
| 451245 ||  || — || April 9, 2010 || Mount Lemmon || Mount Lemmon Survey || — || align=right data-sort-value="0.86" | 860 m || 
|-id=246 bgcolor=#fefefe
| 451246 ||  || — || April 9, 2010 || Catalina || CSS || — || align=right data-sort-value="0.94" | 940 m || 
|-id=247 bgcolor=#fefefe
| 451247 ||  || — || March 3, 2006 || Mount Lemmon || Mount Lemmon Survey || — || align=right data-sort-value="0.82" | 820 m || 
|-id=248 bgcolor=#E9E9E9
| 451248 ||  || — || May 3, 2010 || Kitt Peak || Spacewatch || — || align=right | 1.3 km || 
|-id=249 bgcolor=#fefefe
| 451249 ||  || — || February 10, 2002 || Socorro || LINEAR || — || align=right data-sort-value="0.81" | 810 m || 
|-id=250 bgcolor=#fefefe
| 451250 ||  || — || May 11, 2010 || Mount Lemmon || Mount Lemmon Survey || — || align=right data-sort-value="0.79" | 790 m || 
|-id=251 bgcolor=#FA8072
| 451251 ||  || — || May 12, 2010 || Mount Lemmon || Mount Lemmon Survey || — || align=right | 2.5 km || 
|-id=252 bgcolor=#fefefe
| 451252 ||  || — || May 5, 2010 || Mount Lemmon || Mount Lemmon Survey || — || align=right | 1.2 km || 
|-id=253 bgcolor=#E9E9E9
| 451253 ||  || — || May 19, 2010 || WISE || WISE || DOR || align=right | 2.0 km || 
|-id=254 bgcolor=#E9E9E9
| 451254 ||  || — || May 25, 2010 || WISE || WISE || — || align=right | 1.9 km || 
|-id=255 bgcolor=#E9E9E9
| 451255 ||  || — || May 26, 2010 || WISE || WISE || — || align=right | 2.6 km || 
|-id=256 bgcolor=#E9E9E9
| 451256 ||  || — || June 8, 2010 || WISE || WISE || — || align=right | 2.5 km || 
|-id=257 bgcolor=#d6d6d6
| 451257 ||  || — || June 9, 2010 || WISE || WISE || — || align=right | 1.9 km || 
|-id=258 bgcolor=#E9E9E9
| 451258 ||  || — || June 11, 2010 || WISE || WISE || — || align=right | 2.6 km || 
|-id=259 bgcolor=#E9E9E9
| 451259 ||  || — || June 12, 2010 || WISE || WISE || — || align=right | 3.0 km || 
|-id=260 bgcolor=#E9E9E9
| 451260 ||  || — || June 13, 2010 || Mount Lemmon || Mount Lemmon Survey || — || align=right | 1.7 km || 
|-id=261 bgcolor=#E9E9E9
| 451261 ||  || — || June 18, 2010 || WISE || WISE || — || align=right | 1.8 km || 
|-id=262 bgcolor=#E9E9E9
| 451262 ||  || — || July 2, 2010 || WISE || WISE || DOR || align=right | 2.7 km || 
|-id=263 bgcolor=#d6d6d6
| 451263 ||  || — || July 3, 2010 || WISE || WISE || — || align=right | 2.9 km || 
|-id=264 bgcolor=#E9E9E9
| 451264 ||  || — || July 8, 2010 || WISE || WISE || — || align=right | 1.6 km || 
|-id=265 bgcolor=#E9E9E9
| 451265 ||  || — || September 15, 1996 || Kitt Peak || Spacewatch || — || align=right | 2.6 km || 
|-id=266 bgcolor=#E9E9E9
| 451266 ||  || — || August 29, 2006 || Anderson Mesa || LONEOS || EUN || align=right | 1.5 km || 
|-id=267 bgcolor=#d6d6d6
| 451267 ||  || — || July 21, 2010 || WISE || WISE || — || align=right | 3.6 km || 
|-id=268 bgcolor=#d6d6d6
| 451268 ||  || — || July 28, 2010 || WISE || WISE || — || align=right | 2.2 km || 
|-id=269 bgcolor=#E9E9E9
| 451269 ||  || — || August 2, 2010 || La Sagra || OAM Obs. || — || align=right | 1.7 km || 
|-id=270 bgcolor=#E9E9E9
| 451270 ||  || — || August 10, 2010 || Kitt Peak || Spacewatch || AGN || align=right | 1.1 km || 
|-id=271 bgcolor=#E9E9E9
| 451271 ||  || — || September 1, 2010 || Socorro || LINEAR || — || align=right | 2.4 km || 
|-id=272 bgcolor=#fefefe
| 451272 ||  || — || May 5, 2002 || Socorro || LINEAR || H || align=right data-sort-value="0.87" | 870 m || 
|-id=273 bgcolor=#E9E9E9
| 451273 ||  || — || August 28, 2005 || Kitt Peak || Spacewatch || — || align=right | 2.0 km || 
|-id=274 bgcolor=#E9E9E9
| 451274 ||  || — || February 9, 2008 || Mount Lemmon || Mount Lemmon Survey || — || align=right | 2.2 km || 
|-id=275 bgcolor=#d6d6d6
| 451275 ||  || — || September 6, 2010 || Kitt Peak || Spacewatch || EOS || align=right | 1.6 km || 
|-id=276 bgcolor=#E9E9E9
| 451276 ||  || — || August 27, 2001 || Kitt Peak || Spacewatch || WIT || align=right data-sort-value="0.90" | 900 m || 
|-id=277 bgcolor=#E9E9E9
| 451277 ||  || — || September 9, 2010 || Kitt Peak || Spacewatch || HOF || align=right | 2.5 km || 
|-id=278 bgcolor=#E9E9E9
| 451278 ||  || — || September 10, 2010 || Kitt Peak || Spacewatch || — || align=right | 1.9 km || 
|-id=279 bgcolor=#E9E9E9
| 451279 ||  || — || September 10, 2010 || Kitt Peak || Spacewatch || GEF || align=right | 1.2 km || 
|-id=280 bgcolor=#E9E9E9
| 451280 ||  || — || September 10, 2010 || Kitt Peak || Spacewatch || — || align=right | 1.7 km || 
|-id=281 bgcolor=#E9E9E9
| 451281 ||  || — || October 17, 2001 || Kitt Peak || Spacewatch || — || align=right | 2.2 km || 
|-id=282 bgcolor=#E9E9E9
| 451282 ||  || — || April 6, 2008 || Kitt Peak || Spacewatch || GEF || align=right | 1.3 km || 
|-id=283 bgcolor=#E9E9E9
| 451283 ||  || — || September 14, 2010 || Kitt Peak || Spacewatch || — || align=right | 2.5 km || 
|-id=284 bgcolor=#E9E9E9
| 451284 ||  || — || January 10, 2008 || Mount Lemmon || Mount Lemmon Survey || EUN || align=right | 1.3 km || 
|-id=285 bgcolor=#E9E9E9
| 451285 ||  || — || September 2, 2010 || Mount Lemmon || Mount Lemmon Survey || — || align=right | 2.6 km || 
|-id=286 bgcolor=#d6d6d6
| 451286 ||  || — || September 9, 2010 || Kitt Peak || Spacewatch || — || align=right | 2.9 km || 
|-id=287 bgcolor=#E9E9E9
| 451287 ||  || — || August 23, 2001 || Kitt Peak || Spacewatch || AGN || align=right data-sort-value="0.86" | 860 m || 
|-id=288 bgcolor=#E9E9E9
| 451288 ||  || — || September 30, 2010 || Mount Lemmon || Mount Lemmon Survey || — || align=right | 2.0 km || 
|-id=289 bgcolor=#E9E9E9
| 451289 ||  || — || September 20, 2001 || Socorro || LINEAR || — || align=right | 2.2 km || 
|-id=290 bgcolor=#E9E9E9
| 451290 ||  || — || October 1, 2010 || Kitt Peak || Spacewatch || — || align=right | 2.1 km || 
|-id=291 bgcolor=#d6d6d6
| 451291 ||  || — || July 11, 2010 || WISE || WISE || — || align=right | 2.2 km || 
|-id=292 bgcolor=#E9E9E9
| 451292 ||  || — || September 19, 2010 || Kitt Peak || Spacewatch || — || align=right | 2.0 km || 
|-id=293 bgcolor=#E9E9E9
| 451293 ||  || — || September 15, 2010 || Mount Lemmon || Mount Lemmon Survey || WIT || align=right data-sort-value="0.97" | 970 m || 
|-id=294 bgcolor=#d6d6d6
| 451294 ||  || — || August 30, 2005 || Kitt Peak || Spacewatch || — || align=right | 2.0 km || 
|-id=295 bgcolor=#E9E9E9
| 451295 ||  || — || October 2, 2010 || Kitt Peak || Spacewatch || HOF || align=right | 2.2 km || 
|-id=296 bgcolor=#E9E9E9
| 451296 ||  || — || September 10, 2010 || Kitt Peak || Spacewatch || — || align=right | 1.7 km || 
|-id=297 bgcolor=#FFC2E0
| 451297 ||  || — || October 8, 2010 || Haleakala || Pan-STARRS || APOPHAcritical || align=right data-sort-value="0.51" | 510 m || 
|-id=298 bgcolor=#E9E9E9
| 451298 ||  || — || August 29, 2005 || Kitt Peak || Spacewatch || — || align=right | 2.2 km || 
|-id=299 bgcolor=#d6d6d6
| 451299 ||  || — || August 30, 2005 || Kitt Peak || Spacewatch || KOR || align=right | 1.2 km || 
|-id=300 bgcolor=#d6d6d6
| 451300 ||  || — || April 3, 2008 || Mount Lemmon || Mount Lemmon Survey || KOR || align=right | 1.1 km || 
|}

451301–451400 

|-bgcolor=#E9E9E9
| 451301 ||  || — || July 3, 2005 || Mount Lemmon || Mount Lemmon Survey || — || align=right | 2.2 km || 
|-id=302 bgcolor=#d6d6d6
| 451302 ||  || — || September 17, 2010 || Mount Lemmon || Mount Lemmon Survey || — || align=right | 1.9 km || 
|-id=303 bgcolor=#d6d6d6
| 451303 ||  || — || November 5, 2005 || Kitt Peak || Spacewatch || — || align=right | 2.2 km || 
|-id=304 bgcolor=#E9E9E9
| 451304 ||  || — || October 4, 2006 || Mount Lemmon || Mount Lemmon Survey || — || align=right | 1.7 km || 
|-id=305 bgcolor=#E9E9E9
| 451305 ||  || — || September 18, 2010 || Mount Lemmon || Mount Lemmon Survey || — || align=right | 1.5 km || 
|-id=306 bgcolor=#E9E9E9
| 451306 ||  || — || September 18, 2010 || Mount Lemmon || Mount Lemmon Survey || — || align=right | 2.2 km || 
|-id=307 bgcolor=#d6d6d6
| 451307 ||  || — || August 29, 2005 || Kitt Peak || Spacewatch || — || align=right | 2.3 km || 
|-id=308 bgcolor=#E9E9E9
| 451308 ||  || — || September 16, 2010 || Kitt Peak || Spacewatch || MRX || align=right data-sort-value="0.92" | 920 m || 
|-id=309 bgcolor=#E9E9E9
| 451309 ||  || — || September 17, 2010 || Kitt Peak || Spacewatch || — || align=right | 1.9 km || 
|-id=310 bgcolor=#d6d6d6
| 451310 ||  || — || October 17, 2010 || Mount Lemmon || Mount Lemmon Survey || (1118) || align=right | 2.9 km || 
|-id=311 bgcolor=#d6d6d6
| 451311 ||  || — || October 28, 2010 || Kitt Peak || Spacewatch || — || align=right | 3.4 km || 
|-id=312 bgcolor=#d6d6d6
| 451312 ||  || — || October 28, 2010 || Kitt Peak || Spacewatch || — || align=right | 2.9 km || 
|-id=313 bgcolor=#d6d6d6
| 451313 ||  || — || October 31, 2010 || Mount Lemmon || Mount Lemmon Survey || — || align=right | 2.2 km || 
|-id=314 bgcolor=#d6d6d6
| 451314 ||  || — || October 17, 2010 || Mount Lemmon || Mount Lemmon Survey || EOS || align=right | 1.5 km || 
|-id=315 bgcolor=#d6d6d6
| 451315 ||  || — || October 17, 2010 || Mount Lemmon || Mount Lemmon Survey || VER || align=right | 2.5 km || 
|-id=316 bgcolor=#d6d6d6
| 451316 ||  || — || October 10, 2010 || Kitt Peak || Spacewatch || EOS || align=right | 1.3 km || 
|-id=317 bgcolor=#d6d6d6
| 451317 ||  || — || October 10, 2005 || Kitt Peak || Spacewatch || — || align=right | 2.7 km || 
|-id=318 bgcolor=#d6d6d6
| 451318 ||  || — || October 13, 2010 || Mount Lemmon || Mount Lemmon Survey || — || align=right | 3.0 km || 
|-id=319 bgcolor=#d6d6d6
| 451319 ||  || — || October 29, 2010 || Mount Lemmon || Mount Lemmon Survey || — || align=right | 3.3 km || 
|-id=320 bgcolor=#d6d6d6
| 451320 ||  || — || July 21, 2004 || Siding Spring || SSS || — || align=right | 2.2 km || 
|-id=321 bgcolor=#E9E9E9
| 451321 ||  || — || April 30, 2009 || Kitt Peak || Spacewatch || — || align=right | 2.5 km || 
|-id=322 bgcolor=#d6d6d6
| 451322 ||  || — || October 29, 2010 || Mount Lemmon || Mount Lemmon Survey || EOS || align=right | 2.2 km || 
|-id=323 bgcolor=#d6d6d6
| 451323 ||  || — || September 18, 2010 || Mount Lemmon || Mount Lemmon Survey || — || align=right | 3.1 km || 
|-id=324 bgcolor=#d6d6d6
| 451324 ||  || — || October 13, 2010 || Mount Lemmon || Mount Lemmon Survey || — || align=right | 3.5 km || 
|-id=325 bgcolor=#d6d6d6
| 451325 ||  || — || November 4, 2010 || Mount Lemmon || Mount Lemmon Survey || — || align=right | 3.0 km || 
|-id=326 bgcolor=#E9E9E9
| 451326 ||  || — || August 7, 2010 || WISE || WISE || — || align=right | 3.8 km || 
|-id=327 bgcolor=#d6d6d6
| 451327 ||  || — || November 22, 2005 || Kitt Peak || Spacewatch || — || align=right | 4.4 km || 
|-id=328 bgcolor=#d6d6d6
| 451328 ||  || — || November 3, 2010 || Kitt Peak || Spacewatch || — || align=right | 2.7 km || 
|-id=329 bgcolor=#d6d6d6
| 451329 ||  || — || October 29, 2010 || Kitt Peak || Spacewatch || — || align=right | 2.9 km || 
|-id=330 bgcolor=#E9E9E9
| 451330 ||  || — || March 10, 2008 || Mount Lemmon || Mount Lemmon Survey || — || align=right | 2.3 km || 
|-id=331 bgcolor=#d6d6d6
| 451331 ||  || — || November 5, 2010 || Kitt Peak || Spacewatch || — || align=right | 3.3 km || 
|-id=332 bgcolor=#d6d6d6
| 451332 ||  || — || November 5, 2010 || Kitt Peak || Spacewatch || — || align=right | 3.2 km || 
|-id=333 bgcolor=#d6d6d6
| 451333 ||  || — || October 30, 2010 || Kitt Peak || Spacewatch || EOS || align=right | 2.1 km || 
|-id=334 bgcolor=#d6d6d6
| 451334 ||  || — || March 13, 2007 || Mount Lemmon || Mount Lemmon Survey || — || align=right | 3.1 km || 
|-id=335 bgcolor=#d6d6d6
| 451335 ||  || — || October 9, 2010 || Mount Lemmon || Mount Lemmon Survey || — || align=right | 2.4 km || 
|-id=336 bgcolor=#d6d6d6
| 451336 ||  || — || November 8, 2010 || Kitt Peak || Spacewatch || — || align=right | 2.9 km || 
|-id=337 bgcolor=#d6d6d6
| 451337 ||  || — || October 28, 2005 || Mount Lemmon || Mount Lemmon Survey || — || align=right | 1.7 km || 
|-id=338 bgcolor=#d6d6d6
| 451338 ||  || — || November 10, 2010 || Mount Lemmon || Mount Lemmon Survey || — || align=right | 2.3 km || 
|-id=339 bgcolor=#d6d6d6
| 451339 ||  || — || November 10, 2010 || Mount Lemmon || Mount Lemmon Survey || — || align=right | 2.8 km || 
|-id=340 bgcolor=#d6d6d6
| 451340 ||  || — || November 5, 2010 || Kitt Peak || Spacewatch || — || align=right | 2.4 km || 
|-id=341 bgcolor=#d6d6d6
| 451341 ||  || — || November 21, 2005 || Kitt Peak || Spacewatch || — || align=right | 1.8 km || 
|-id=342 bgcolor=#d6d6d6
| 451342 ||  || — || January 10, 2006 || Mount Lemmon || Mount Lemmon Survey || — || align=right | 3.5 km || 
|-id=343 bgcolor=#d6d6d6
| 451343 ||  || — || October 13, 2010 || Mount Lemmon || Mount Lemmon Survey || — || align=right | 2.6 km || 
|-id=344 bgcolor=#d6d6d6
| 451344 ||  || — || October 13, 2010 || Mount Lemmon || Mount Lemmon Survey || — || align=right | 2.3 km || 
|-id=345 bgcolor=#d6d6d6
| 451345 ||  || — || September 26, 2005 || Kitt Peak || Spacewatch || — || align=right | 2.2 km || 
|-id=346 bgcolor=#d6d6d6
| 451346 ||  || — || November 12, 2005 || Kitt Peak || Spacewatch || — || align=right | 1.8 km || 
|-id=347 bgcolor=#d6d6d6
| 451347 ||  || — || October 29, 2005 || Catalina || CSS || — || align=right | 1.9 km || 
|-id=348 bgcolor=#d6d6d6
| 451348 ||  || — || November 22, 2005 || Kitt Peak || Spacewatch || — || align=right | 2.5 km || 
|-id=349 bgcolor=#d6d6d6
| 451349 ||  || — || October 30, 2010 || Mount Lemmon || Mount Lemmon Survey || — || align=right | 2.0 km || 
|-id=350 bgcolor=#d6d6d6
| 451350 ||  || — || November 11, 2010 || Mount Lemmon || Mount Lemmon Survey || EOS || align=right | 1.9 km || 
|-id=351 bgcolor=#d6d6d6
| 451351 ||  || — || November 1, 2010 || Kitt Peak || Spacewatch || EOS || align=right | 2.1 km || 
|-id=352 bgcolor=#d6d6d6
| 451352 ||  || — || November 11, 2010 || Kitt Peak || Spacewatch || — || align=right | 2.0 km || 
|-id=353 bgcolor=#d6d6d6
| 451353 ||  || — || November 27, 2010 || Mount Lemmon || Mount Lemmon Survey || TEL || align=right | 1.5 km || 
|-id=354 bgcolor=#d6d6d6
| 451354 ||  || — || November 2, 2010 || Kitt Peak || Spacewatch || — || align=right | 3.4 km || 
|-id=355 bgcolor=#d6d6d6
| 451355 ||  || — || October 13, 2010 || Mount Lemmon || Mount Lemmon Survey || EOS || align=right | 2.1 km || 
|-id=356 bgcolor=#d6d6d6
| 451356 ||  || — || December 1, 2005 || Kitt Peak || Spacewatch || — || align=right | 3.3 km || 
|-id=357 bgcolor=#d6d6d6
| 451357 ||  || — || November 14, 2010 || Kitt Peak || Spacewatch || — || align=right | 2.1 km || 
|-id=358 bgcolor=#d6d6d6
| 451358 ||  || — || October 29, 2010 || Kitt Peak || Spacewatch || — || align=right | 2.7 km || 
|-id=359 bgcolor=#d6d6d6
| 451359 ||  || — || October 10, 2004 || Kitt Peak || Spacewatch || — || align=right | 2.1 km || 
|-id=360 bgcolor=#FA8072
| 451360 ||  || — || December 4, 2010 || Catalina || CSS || H || align=right | 1.1 km || 
|-id=361 bgcolor=#d6d6d6
| 451361 ||  || — || October 9, 2004 || Kitt Peak || Spacewatch || — || align=right | 2.2 km || 
|-id=362 bgcolor=#d6d6d6
| 451362 ||  || — || January 23, 2006 || Catalina || CSS || — || align=right | 3.3 km || 
|-id=363 bgcolor=#d6d6d6
| 451363 ||  || — || November 29, 2005 || Kitt Peak || Spacewatch || — || align=right | 2.6 km || 
|-id=364 bgcolor=#d6d6d6
| 451364 ||  || — || January 4, 2006 || Kitt Peak || Spacewatch || — || align=right | 1.9 km || 
|-id=365 bgcolor=#d6d6d6
| 451365 ||  || — || November 30, 2005 || Kitt Peak || Spacewatch || EOS || align=right | 1.8 km || 
|-id=366 bgcolor=#d6d6d6
| 451366 ||  || — || September 4, 2010 || Kitt Peak || Spacewatch || — || align=right | 3.8 km || 
|-id=367 bgcolor=#d6d6d6
| 451367 ||  || — || December 3, 2010 || Mount Lemmon || Mount Lemmon Survey || — || align=right | 3.2 km || 
|-id=368 bgcolor=#d6d6d6
| 451368 ||  || — || November 2, 2010 || Kitt Peak || Spacewatch || — || align=right | 2.6 km || 
|-id=369 bgcolor=#d6d6d6
| 451369 ||  || — || August 16, 2004 || Siding Spring || SSS || — || align=right | 3.2 km || 
|-id=370 bgcolor=#FFC2E0
| 451370 ||  || — || January 8, 2011 || Mount Lemmon || Mount Lemmon Survey || APOPHA || align=right data-sort-value="0.18" | 180 m || 
|-id=371 bgcolor=#d6d6d6
| 451371 ||  || — || October 14, 2010 || Mount Lemmon || Mount Lemmon Survey || — || align=right | 2.5 km || 
|-id=372 bgcolor=#d6d6d6
| 451372 ||  || — || September 15, 2009 || Kitt Peak || Spacewatch || LIX || align=right | 3.4 km || 
|-id=373 bgcolor=#d6d6d6
| 451373 ||  || — || December 15, 2004 || Socorro || LINEAR || — || align=right | 4.3 km || 
|-id=374 bgcolor=#d6d6d6
| 451374 ||  || — || December 9, 2010 || Mount Lemmon || Mount Lemmon Survey || LIX || align=right | 3.8 km || 
|-id=375 bgcolor=#d6d6d6
| 451375 ||  || — || September 16, 2009 || Mount Lemmon || Mount Lemmon Survey || — || align=right | 2.4 km || 
|-id=376 bgcolor=#d6d6d6
| 451376 ||  || — || September 27, 2009 || Kitt Peak || Spacewatch || — || align=right | 2.1 km || 
|-id=377 bgcolor=#d6d6d6
| 451377 ||  || — || December 2, 2004 || Kitt Peak || Spacewatch || THB || align=right | 2.9 km || 
|-id=378 bgcolor=#d6d6d6
| 451378 ||  || — || December 12, 2004 || Kitt Peak || Spacewatch || — || align=right | 4.0 km || 
|-id=379 bgcolor=#d6d6d6
| 451379 ||  || — || December 3, 2010 || Mount Lemmon || Mount Lemmon Survey || LIX || align=right | 2.9 km || 
|-id=380 bgcolor=#d6d6d6
| 451380 ||  || — || November 15, 2010 || Mount Lemmon || Mount Lemmon Survey || VER || align=right | 2.6 km || 
|-id=381 bgcolor=#d6d6d6
| 451381 ||  || — || September 16, 2003 || Kitt Peak || Spacewatch || — || align=right | 3.6 km || 
|-id=382 bgcolor=#d6d6d6
| 451382 ||  || — || January 25, 2011 || Catalina || CSS || Tj (2.98) || align=right | 3.8 km || 
|-id=383 bgcolor=#d6d6d6
| 451383 ||  || — || December 5, 2010 || Mount Lemmon || Mount Lemmon Survey || — || align=right | 3.9 km || 
|-id=384 bgcolor=#d6d6d6
| 451384 ||  || — || September 7, 2008 || Mount Lemmon || Mount Lemmon Survey || — || align=right | 2.9 km || 
|-id=385 bgcolor=#d6d6d6
| 451385 ||  || — || February 11, 2010 || WISE || WISE || 7:4 || align=right | 3.4 km || 
|-id=386 bgcolor=#fefefe
| 451386 ||  || — || January 10, 2011 || Mount Lemmon || Mount Lemmon Survey || H || align=right data-sort-value="0.85" | 850 m || 
|-id=387 bgcolor=#d6d6d6
| 451387 ||  || — || July 29, 2009 || Kitt Peak || Spacewatch || — || align=right | 3.0 km || 
|-id=388 bgcolor=#d6d6d6
| 451388 ||  || — || March 23, 2006 || Mount Lemmon || Mount Lemmon Survey || — || align=right | 2.4 km || 
|-id=389 bgcolor=#d6d6d6
| 451389 ||  || — || January 14, 2010 || WISE || WISE || — || align=right | 2.4 km || 
|-id=390 bgcolor=#d6d6d6
| 451390 ||  || — || September 16, 2009 || Kitt Peak || Spacewatch || — || align=right | 1.9 km || 
|-id=391 bgcolor=#d6d6d6
| 451391 ||  || — || January 13, 2011 || Kitt Peak || Spacewatch || — || align=right | 2.8 km || 
|-id=392 bgcolor=#d6d6d6
| 451392 ||  || — || October 26, 2009 || Mount Lemmon || Mount Lemmon Survey || Tj (2.99) || align=right | 3.0 km || 
|-id=393 bgcolor=#d6d6d6
| 451393 ||  || — || January 13, 2010 || WISE || WISE || Tj (2.96) || align=right | 3.1 km || 
|-id=394 bgcolor=#d6d6d6
| 451394 ||  || — || February 10, 2011 || Mount Lemmon || Mount Lemmon Survey || — || align=right | 2.1 km || 
|-id=395 bgcolor=#d6d6d6
| 451395 ||  || — || January 2, 2011 || Mount Lemmon || Mount Lemmon Survey || — || align=right | 2.7 km || 
|-id=396 bgcolor=#fefefe
| 451396 ||  || — || February 22, 2011 || Kitt Peak || Spacewatch || H || align=right data-sort-value="0.83" | 830 m || 
|-id=397 bgcolor=#FFC2E0
| 451397 ||  || — || March 15, 2011 || Mount Lemmon || Mount Lemmon Survey || AMO +1km || align=right | 1.3 km || 
|-id=398 bgcolor=#fefefe
| 451398 ||  || — || March 4, 2011 || Mount Lemmon || Mount Lemmon Survey || H || align=right | 1.0 km || 
|-id=399 bgcolor=#FA8072
| 451399 ||  || — || March 2, 2005 || Socorro || LINEAR || Tj (2.92) || align=right | 1.5 km || 
|-id=400 bgcolor=#fefefe
| 451400 ||  || — || October 31, 1999 || Kitt Peak || Spacewatch || — || align=right data-sort-value="0.68" | 680 m || 
|}

451401–451500 

|-bgcolor=#FA8072
| 451401 ||  || — || April 27, 2011 || Catalina || CSS || — || align=right data-sort-value="0.86" | 860 m || 
|-id=402 bgcolor=#fefefe
| 451402 ||  || — || January 7, 2010 || Mount Lemmon || Mount Lemmon Survey || — || align=right data-sort-value="0.64" | 640 m || 
|-id=403 bgcolor=#fefefe
| 451403 ||  || — || June 26, 2011 || Mount Lemmon || Mount Lemmon Survey || — || align=right data-sort-value="0.82" | 820 m || 
|-id=404 bgcolor=#fefefe
| 451404 ||  || — || October 10, 2008 || Mount Lemmon || Mount Lemmon Survey || — || align=right data-sort-value="0.92" | 920 m || 
|-id=405 bgcolor=#fefefe
| 451405 ||  || — || October 29, 2008 || Kitt Peak || Spacewatch || — || align=right data-sort-value="0.74" | 740 m || 
|-id=406 bgcolor=#fefefe
| 451406 ||  || — || November 4, 2004 || Kitt Peak || Spacewatch || — || align=right data-sort-value="0.65" | 650 m || 
|-id=407 bgcolor=#fefefe
| 451407 ||  || — || January 20, 2006 || Kitt Peak || Spacewatch || — || align=right data-sort-value="0.91" | 910 m || 
|-id=408 bgcolor=#fefefe
| 451408 ||  || — || May 28, 2011 || Mount Lemmon || Mount Lemmon Survey || — || align=right data-sort-value="0.67" | 670 m || 
|-id=409 bgcolor=#fefefe
| 451409 ||  || — || July 28, 2011 || Siding Spring || SSS || — || align=right data-sort-value="0.84" | 840 m || 
|-id=410 bgcolor=#fefefe
| 451410 ||  || — || June 12, 2011 || Mount Lemmon || Mount Lemmon Survey || — || align=right data-sort-value="0.78" | 780 m || 
|-id=411 bgcolor=#fefefe
| 451411 ||  || — || September 24, 2000 || Anderson Mesa || LONEOS || — || align=right data-sort-value="0.78" | 780 m || 
|-id=412 bgcolor=#fefefe
| 451412 ||  || — || March 11, 2007 || Catalina || CSS || — || align=right data-sort-value="0.93" | 930 m || 
|-id=413 bgcolor=#fefefe
| 451413 ||  || — || September 24, 2000 || Anderson Mesa || LONEOS || critical || align=right data-sort-value="0.65" | 650 m || 
|-id=414 bgcolor=#fefefe
| 451414 ||  || — || May 28, 2011 || Mount Lemmon || Mount Lemmon Survey || — || align=right | 1.1 km || 
|-id=415 bgcolor=#fefefe
| 451415 ||  || — || June 17, 2007 || Kitt Peak || Spacewatch || — || align=right data-sort-value="0.77" | 770 m || 
|-id=416 bgcolor=#fefefe
| 451416 ||  || — || October 8, 2008 || Mount Lemmon || Mount Lemmon Survey || — || align=right data-sort-value="0.65" | 650 m || 
|-id=417 bgcolor=#fefefe
| 451417 ||  || — || November 29, 2005 || Kitt Peak || Spacewatch || — || align=right data-sort-value="0.83" | 830 m || 
|-id=418 bgcolor=#fefefe
| 451418 ||  || — || October 8, 2004 || Kitt Peak || Spacewatch || NYS || align=right data-sort-value="0.52" | 520 m || 
|-id=419 bgcolor=#fefefe
| 451419 ||  || — || December 13, 2004 || Kitt Peak || Spacewatch || NYS || align=right data-sort-value="0.69" | 690 m || 
|-id=420 bgcolor=#fefefe
| 451420 ||  || — || October 8, 2004 || Kitt Peak || Spacewatch || critical || align=right data-sort-value="0.62" | 620 m || 
|-id=421 bgcolor=#fefefe
| 451421 ||  || — || August 23, 2007 || Kitt Peak || Spacewatch || — || align=right data-sort-value="0.82" | 820 m || 
|-id=422 bgcolor=#fefefe
| 451422 ||  || — || September 28, 2000 || Kitt Peak || Spacewatch || — || align=right data-sort-value="0.75" | 750 m || 
|-id=423 bgcolor=#fefefe
| 451423 ||  || — || December 29, 2008 || Mount Lemmon || Mount Lemmon Survey || — || align=right data-sort-value="0.68" | 680 m || 
|-id=424 bgcolor=#fefefe
| 451424 ||  || — || September 7, 2011 || Kitt Peak || Spacewatch || MAS || align=right data-sort-value="0.67" | 670 m || 
|-id=425 bgcolor=#fefefe
| 451425 ||  || — || August 22, 2007 || Anderson Mesa || LONEOS || — || align=right data-sort-value="0.73" | 730 m || 
|-id=426 bgcolor=#fefefe
| 451426 ||  || — || October 23, 2008 || Kitt Peak || Spacewatch || — || align=right data-sort-value="0.62" | 620 m || 
|-id=427 bgcolor=#fefefe
| 451427 ||  || — || March 13, 2010 || Mount Lemmon || Mount Lemmon Survey || — || align=right data-sort-value="0.71" | 710 m || 
|-id=428 bgcolor=#fefefe
| 451428 ||  || — || October 9, 1993 || Kitt Peak || Spacewatch || — || align=right data-sort-value="0.73" | 730 m || 
|-id=429 bgcolor=#fefefe
| 451429 ||  || — || January 25, 2009 || Kitt Peak || Spacewatch || — || align=right data-sort-value="0.83" | 830 m || 
|-id=430 bgcolor=#fefefe
| 451430 ||  || — || February 5, 2009 || Kitt Peak || Spacewatch || — || align=right data-sort-value="0.57" | 570 m || 
|-id=431 bgcolor=#fefefe
| 451431 ||  || — || January 26, 2006 || Kitt Peak || Spacewatch || — || align=right data-sort-value="0.68" | 680 m || 
|-id=432 bgcolor=#fefefe
| 451432 ||  || — || September 27, 2000 || Socorro || LINEAR || — || align=right data-sort-value="0.87" | 870 m || 
|-id=433 bgcolor=#fefefe
| 451433 ||  || — || October 17, 2007 || Mount Lemmon || Mount Lemmon Survey || — || align=right data-sort-value="0.94" | 940 m || 
|-id=434 bgcolor=#fefefe
| 451434 ||  || — || January 31, 2006 || Kitt Peak || Spacewatch || — || align=right | 1.1 km || 
|-id=435 bgcolor=#fefefe
| 451435 ||  || — || February 2, 2009 || Mount Lemmon || Mount Lemmon Survey || V || align=right data-sort-value="0.62" | 620 m || 
|-id=436 bgcolor=#E9E9E9
| 451436 ||  || — || September 21, 2011 || Kitt Peak || Spacewatch || — || align=right | 1.8 km || 
|-id=437 bgcolor=#fefefe
| 451437 ||  || — || September 9, 2011 || Kitt Peak || Spacewatch || — || align=right data-sort-value="0.80" | 800 m || 
|-id=438 bgcolor=#fefefe
| 451438 ||  || — || February 12, 2002 || Kitt Peak || Spacewatch || V || align=right data-sort-value="0.65" | 650 m || 
|-id=439 bgcolor=#fefefe
| 451439 ||  || — || September 22, 2011 || Kitt Peak || Spacewatch || critical || align=right data-sort-value="0.94" | 940 m || 
|-id=440 bgcolor=#fefefe
| 451440 ||  || — || September 20, 2011 || Catalina || CSS || — || align=right data-sort-value="0.98" | 980 m || 
|-id=441 bgcolor=#fefefe
| 451441 ||  || — || September 8, 2011 || Kitt Peak || Spacewatch || — || align=right data-sort-value="0.86" | 860 m || 
|-id=442 bgcolor=#E9E9E9
| 451442 ||  || — || September 23, 2011 || Kitt Peak || Spacewatch || — || align=right data-sort-value="0.92" | 920 m || 
|-id=443 bgcolor=#E9E9E9
| 451443 ||  || — || September 8, 2007 || Mount Lemmon || Mount Lemmon Survey || — || align=right data-sort-value="0.68" | 680 m || 
|-id=444 bgcolor=#fefefe
| 451444 ||  || — || February 25, 2006 || Kitt Peak || Spacewatch || — || align=right data-sort-value="0.89" | 890 m || 
|-id=445 bgcolor=#fefefe
| 451445 ||  || — || September 18, 2011 || Mount Lemmon || Mount Lemmon Survey || V || align=right data-sort-value="0.72" | 720 m || 
|-id=446 bgcolor=#fefefe
| 451446 ||  || — || October 4, 2007 || Mount Lemmon || Mount Lemmon Survey || — || align=right data-sort-value="0.74" | 740 m || 
|-id=447 bgcolor=#E9E9E9
| 451447 ||  || — || October 19, 2003 || Kitt Peak || Spacewatch || — || align=right data-sort-value="0.47" | 470 m || 
|-id=448 bgcolor=#fefefe
| 451448 ||  || — || December 20, 2004 || Mount Lemmon || Mount Lemmon Survey || — || align=right data-sort-value="0.87" | 870 m || 
|-id=449 bgcolor=#fefefe
| 451449 ||  || — || February 4, 2005 || Kitt Peak || Spacewatch || MAS || align=right data-sort-value="0.75" | 750 m || 
|-id=450 bgcolor=#E9E9E9
| 451450 ||  || — || March 3, 2009 || Kitt Peak || Spacewatch || — || align=right | 1.4 km || 
|-id=451 bgcolor=#fefefe
| 451451 ||  || — || January 15, 2005 || Kitt Peak || Spacewatch || NYS || align=right data-sort-value="0.66" | 660 m || 
|-id=452 bgcolor=#fefefe
| 451452 ||  || — || March 2, 2009 || Mount Lemmon || Mount Lemmon Survey || — || align=right data-sort-value="0.96" | 960 m || 
|-id=453 bgcolor=#E9E9E9
| 451453 ||  || — || November 7, 2007 || Catalina || CSS || — || align=right data-sort-value="0.98" | 980 m || 
|-id=454 bgcolor=#fefefe
| 451454 ||  || — || January 19, 2009 || Mount Lemmon || Mount Lemmon Survey || — || align=right data-sort-value="0.98" | 980 m || 
|-id=455 bgcolor=#fefefe
| 451455 ||  || — || August 11, 2007 || Anderson Mesa || LONEOS || — || align=right data-sort-value="0.79" | 790 m || 
|-id=456 bgcolor=#fefefe
| 451456 ||  || — || March 24, 2006 || Kitt Peak || Spacewatch || — || align=right | 1.1 km || 
|-id=457 bgcolor=#fefefe
| 451457 ||  || — || December 9, 2004 || Kitt Peak || Spacewatch || — || align=right data-sort-value="0.86" | 860 m || 
|-id=458 bgcolor=#fefefe
| 451458 ||  || — || December 4, 2008 || Mount Lemmon || Mount Lemmon Survey || — || align=right data-sort-value="0.86" | 860 m || 
|-id=459 bgcolor=#fefefe
| 451459 ||  || — || September 13, 2007 || Catalina || CSS || — || align=right | 1.3 km || 
|-id=460 bgcolor=#fefefe
| 451460 ||  || — || December 11, 2004 || Kitt Peak || Spacewatch || — || align=right data-sort-value="0.81" | 810 m || 
|-id=461 bgcolor=#E9E9E9
| 451461 ||  || — || October 18, 2011 || Mount Lemmon || Mount Lemmon Survey || — || align=right data-sort-value="0.85" | 850 m || 
|-id=462 bgcolor=#E9E9E9
| 451462 ||  || — || November 14, 2007 || Kitt Peak || Spacewatch || (5) || align=right data-sort-value="0.69" | 690 m || 
|-id=463 bgcolor=#E9E9E9
| 451463 ||  || — || October 15, 2007 || Kitt Peak || Spacewatch || — || align=right data-sort-value="0.75" | 750 m || 
|-id=464 bgcolor=#E9E9E9
| 451464 ||  || — || October 14, 1999 || Kitt Peak || Spacewatch || (5) || align=right data-sort-value="0.57" | 570 m || 
|-id=465 bgcolor=#fefefe
| 451465 ||  || — || February 20, 2009 || Kitt Peak || Spacewatch || NYS || align=right data-sort-value="0.57" | 570 m || 
|-id=466 bgcolor=#fefefe
| 451466 ||  || — || September 2, 2007 || Mount Lemmon || Mount Lemmon Survey || — || align=right data-sort-value="0.90" | 900 m || 
|-id=467 bgcolor=#fefefe
| 451467 ||  || — || August 24, 2007 || Kitt Peak || Spacewatch || NYS || align=right data-sort-value="0.58" | 580 m || 
|-id=468 bgcolor=#fefefe
| 451468 ||  || — || September 28, 2011 || Mount Lemmon || Mount Lemmon Survey || — || align=right data-sort-value="0.86" | 860 m || 
|-id=469 bgcolor=#fefefe
| 451469 ||  || — || November 1, 2000 || Socorro || LINEAR || MAS || align=right data-sort-value="0.86" | 860 m || 
|-id=470 bgcolor=#E9E9E9
| 451470 ||  || — || February 18, 2004 || Kitt Peak || Spacewatch || — || align=right | 2.3 km || 
|-id=471 bgcolor=#E9E9E9
| 451471 ||  || — || November 17, 2007 || Kitt Peak || Spacewatch || — || align=right data-sort-value="0.94" | 940 m || 
|-id=472 bgcolor=#fefefe
| 451472 ||  || — || September 13, 2007 || Mount Lemmon || Mount Lemmon Survey || — || align=right data-sort-value="0.65" | 650 m || 
|-id=473 bgcolor=#E9E9E9
| 451473 ||  || — || October 18, 2011 || Kitt Peak || Spacewatch || — || align=right data-sort-value="0.84" | 840 m || 
|-id=474 bgcolor=#E9E9E9
| 451474 ||  || — || September 14, 2007 || Mount Lemmon || Mount Lemmon Survey || — || align=right data-sort-value="0.75" | 750 m || 
|-id=475 bgcolor=#E9E9E9
| 451475 ||  || — || April 20, 2009 || Kitt Peak || Spacewatch || ADE || align=right | 1.9 km || 
|-id=476 bgcolor=#E9E9E9
| 451476 ||  || — || November 5, 2007 || Kitt Peak || Spacewatch || BRG || align=right | 1.1 km || 
|-id=477 bgcolor=#E9E9E9
| 451477 ||  || — || October 16, 2007 || Mount Lemmon || Mount Lemmon Survey || — || align=right | 1.00 km || 
|-id=478 bgcolor=#E9E9E9
| 451478 ||  || — || October 16, 2007 || Mount Lemmon || Mount Lemmon Survey || MAR || align=right data-sort-value="0.84" | 840 m || 
|-id=479 bgcolor=#fefefe
| 451479 ||  || — || February 2, 2009 || Catalina || CSS || — || align=right | 1.2 km || 
|-id=480 bgcolor=#fefefe
| 451480 ||  || — || January 19, 2005 || Kitt Peak || Spacewatch || — || align=right data-sort-value="0.76" | 760 m || 
|-id=481 bgcolor=#E9E9E9
| 451481 ||  || — || October 19, 2011 || Kitt Peak || Spacewatch || — || align=right | 1.2 km || 
|-id=482 bgcolor=#E9E9E9
| 451482 ||  || — || October 21, 2011 || Mount Lemmon || Mount Lemmon Survey || — || align=right | 1.3 km || 
|-id=483 bgcolor=#fefefe
| 451483 ||  || — || April 10, 2005 || Kitt Peak || Spacewatch || — || align=right | 2.4 km || 
|-id=484 bgcolor=#E9E9E9
| 451484 ||  || — || October 20, 2011 || Kitt Peak || Spacewatch || — || align=right | 1.7 km || 
|-id=485 bgcolor=#E9E9E9
| 451485 ||  || — || February 11, 2004 || Kitt Peak || Spacewatch || — || align=right | 1.6 km || 
|-id=486 bgcolor=#E9E9E9
| 451486 ||  || — || November 3, 2007 || Kitt Peak || Spacewatch || (5) || align=right data-sort-value="0.69" | 690 m || 
|-id=487 bgcolor=#fefefe
| 451487 ||  || — || August 14, 2007 || Siding Spring || SSS || — || align=right data-sort-value="0.82" | 820 m || 
|-id=488 bgcolor=#E9E9E9
| 451488 ||  || — || October 20, 2011 || Mount Lemmon || Mount Lemmon Survey || — || align=right | 1.8 km || 
|-id=489 bgcolor=#E9E9E9
| 451489 ||  || — || April 16, 2010 || WISE || WISE || — || align=right | 3.9 km || 
|-id=490 bgcolor=#E9E9E9
| 451490 ||  || — || April 10, 2005 || Mount Lemmon || Mount Lemmon Survey || — || align=right | 2.4 km || 
|-id=491 bgcolor=#E9E9E9
| 451491 ||  || — || November 8, 2007 || Kitt Peak || Spacewatch || — || align=right data-sort-value="0.87" | 870 m || 
|-id=492 bgcolor=#E9E9E9
| 451492 ||  || — || December 18, 2003 || Kitt Peak || Spacewatch || — || align=right data-sort-value="0.71" | 710 m || 
|-id=493 bgcolor=#fefefe
| 451493 ||  || — || December 30, 2000 || Socorro || LINEAR || — || align=right data-sort-value="0.87" | 870 m || 
|-id=494 bgcolor=#E9E9E9
| 451494 ||  || — || September 24, 2011 || Mount Lemmon || Mount Lemmon Survey || — || align=right | 2.1 km || 
|-id=495 bgcolor=#E9E9E9
| 451495 ||  || — || November 13, 2007 || Kitt Peak || Spacewatch || — || align=right data-sort-value="0.86" | 860 m || 
|-id=496 bgcolor=#fefefe
| 451496 ||  || — || September 11, 2007 || Kitt Peak || Spacewatch || — || align=right data-sort-value="0.75" | 750 m || 
|-id=497 bgcolor=#fefefe
| 451497 ||  || — || September 10, 2007 || Kitt Peak || Spacewatch || — || align=right data-sort-value="0.76" | 760 m || 
|-id=498 bgcolor=#fefefe
| 451498 ||  || — || October 8, 2007 || Catalina || CSS || — || align=right data-sort-value="0.75" | 750 m || 
|-id=499 bgcolor=#E9E9E9
| 451499 ||  || — || September 24, 2011 || Mount Lemmon || Mount Lemmon Survey || — || align=right | 2.1 km || 
|-id=500 bgcolor=#E9E9E9
| 451500 ||  || — || November 13, 2007 || Kitt Peak || Spacewatch || — || align=right data-sort-value="0.98" | 980 m || 
|}

451501–451600 

|-bgcolor=#E9E9E9
| 451501 ||  || — || November 4, 2007 || Kitt Peak || Spacewatch || — || align=right data-sort-value="0.94" | 940 m || 
|-id=502 bgcolor=#E9E9E9
| 451502 ||  || — || October 17, 2007 || Mount Lemmon || Mount Lemmon Survey || — || align=right data-sort-value="0.75" | 750 m || 
|-id=503 bgcolor=#E9E9E9
| 451503 ||  || — || November 9, 2007 || Kitt Peak || Spacewatch || — || align=right | 1.1 km || 
|-id=504 bgcolor=#E9E9E9
| 451504 ||  || — || May 23, 2010 || WISE || WISE || KON || align=right | 2.5 km || 
|-id=505 bgcolor=#fefefe
| 451505 ||  || — || September 14, 2007 || Mount Lemmon || Mount Lemmon Survey || — || align=right data-sort-value="0.66" | 660 m || 
|-id=506 bgcolor=#fefefe
| 451506 ||  || — || October 4, 2007 || Mount Lemmon || Mount Lemmon Survey || MAS || align=right data-sort-value="0.82" | 820 m || 
|-id=507 bgcolor=#E9E9E9
| 451507 ||  || — || September 22, 2011 || Mount Lemmon || Mount Lemmon Survey || — || align=right | 2.3 km || 
|-id=508 bgcolor=#E9E9E9
| 451508 ||  || — || November 5, 2007 || Mount Lemmon || Mount Lemmon Survey || — || align=right | 1.2 km || 
|-id=509 bgcolor=#E9E9E9
| 451509 ||  || — || December 16, 2007 || Catalina || CSS || — || align=right | 1.6 km || 
|-id=510 bgcolor=#E9E9E9
| 451510 ||  || — || December 11, 1998 || Kitt Peak || Spacewatch || — || align=right | 1.7 km || 
|-id=511 bgcolor=#fefefe
| 451511 ||  || — || September 14, 2007 || Kitt Peak || Spacewatch || — || align=right data-sort-value="0.75" | 750 m || 
|-id=512 bgcolor=#fefefe
| 451512 ||  || — || September 10, 2004 || Kitt Peak || Spacewatch || V || align=right data-sort-value="0.56" | 560 m || 
|-id=513 bgcolor=#E9E9E9
| 451513 ||  || — || October 5, 2007 || Kitt Peak || Spacewatch || — || align=right data-sort-value="0.97" | 970 m || 
|-id=514 bgcolor=#fefefe
| 451514 ||  || — || June 13, 2010 || WISE || WISE || — || align=right | 2.4 km || 
|-id=515 bgcolor=#E9E9E9
| 451515 ||  || — || November 18, 2007 || Mount Lemmon || Mount Lemmon Survey || — || align=right | 1.0 km || 
|-id=516 bgcolor=#fefefe
| 451516 ||  || — || September 14, 2007 || Kitt Peak || Spacewatch || MAS || align=right data-sort-value="0.71" | 710 m || 
|-id=517 bgcolor=#E9E9E9
| 451517 ||  || — || September 27, 2011 || Mount Lemmon || Mount Lemmon Survey || — || align=right data-sort-value="0.83" | 830 m || 
|-id=518 bgcolor=#E9E9E9
| 451518 ||  || — || October 29, 1998 || Kitt Peak || Spacewatch || EUN || align=right data-sort-value="0.95" | 950 m || 
|-id=519 bgcolor=#E9E9E9
| 451519 ||  || — || November 20, 2007 || Mount Lemmon || Mount Lemmon Survey || — || align=right | 1.1 km || 
|-id=520 bgcolor=#E9E9E9
| 451520 ||  || — || November 23, 2003 || Socorro || LINEAR || — || align=right | 2.6 km || 
|-id=521 bgcolor=#E9E9E9
| 451521 ||  || — || October 16, 2007 || Catalina || CSS || — || align=right | 1.2 km || 
|-id=522 bgcolor=#E9E9E9
| 451522 ||  || — || October 17, 2007 || Mount Lemmon || Mount Lemmon Survey || EUN || align=right data-sort-value="0.80" | 800 m || 
|-id=523 bgcolor=#E9E9E9
| 451523 ||  || — || November 14, 2007 || Kitt Peak || Spacewatch || — || align=right | 1.0 km || 
|-id=524 bgcolor=#E9E9E9
| 451524 ||  || — || November 3, 2011 || Kitt Peak || Spacewatch || — || align=right | 2.1 km || 
|-id=525 bgcolor=#E9E9E9
| 451525 ||  || — || June 12, 2010 || WISE || WISE || — || align=right | 3.2 km || 
|-id=526 bgcolor=#fefefe
| 451526 ||  || — || January 20, 2009 || Kitt Peak || Spacewatch || — || align=right data-sort-value="0.64" | 640 m || 
|-id=527 bgcolor=#E9E9E9
| 451527 ||  || — || November 16, 2011 || Mount Lemmon || Mount Lemmon Survey || — || align=right | 1.3 km || 
|-id=528 bgcolor=#E9E9E9
| 451528 ||  || — || March 2, 2009 || Mount Lemmon || Mount Lemmon Survey || KON || align=right | 2.6 km || 
|-id=529 bgcolor=#E9E9E9
| 451529 ||  || — || October 13, 2006 || Kitt Peak || Spacewatch || GEF || align=right | 1.3 km || 
|-id=530 bgcolor=#E9E9E9
| 451530 ||  || — || November 2, 2011 || Kitt Peak || Spacewatch || EUN || align=right | 1.1 km || 
|-id=531 bgcolor=#E9E9E9
| 451531 ||  || — || October 27, 2011 || Mount Lemmon || Mount Lemmon Survey || (5) || align=right data-sort-value="0.66" | 660 m || 
|-id=532 bgcolor=#E9E9E9
| 451532 ||  || — || October 22, 2011 || Kitt Peak || Spacewatch || — || align=right data-sort-value="0.82" | 820 m || 
|-id=533 bgcolor=#E9E9E9
| 451533 ||  || — || April 30, 2009 || Catalina || CSS || EUN || align=right | 1.5 km || 
|-id=534 bgcolor=#E9E9E9
| 451534 ||  || — || November 22, 2011 || XuYi || PMO NEO || — || align=right | 1.5 km || 
|-id=535 bgcolor=#E9E9E9
| 451535 ||  || — || November 17, 2007 || Mount Lemmon || Mount Lemmon Survey || — || align=right | 1.4 km || 
|-id=536 bgcolor=#fefefe
| 451536 ||  || — || October 9, 2007 || Mount Lemmon || Mount Lemmon Survey || — || align=right data-sort-value="0.71" | 710 m || 
|-id=537 bgcolor=#E9E9E9
| 451537 ||  || — || November 23, 2011 || Mount Lemmon || Mount Lemmon Survey || — || align=right | 1.1 km || 
|-id=538 bgcolor=#E9E9E9
| 451538 ||  || — || November 16, 2011 || Mount Lemmon || Mount Lemmon Survey || — || align=right | 1.0 km || 
|-id=539 bgcolor=#E9E9E9
| 451539 ||  || — || November 8, 2007 || Mount Lemmon || Mount Lemmon Survey || — || align=right | 1.5 km || 
|-id=540 bgcolor=#E9E9E9
| 451540 ||  || — || December 5, 2007 || Kitt Peak || Spacewatch || — || align=right | 1.3 km || 
|-id=541 bgcolor=#E9E9E9
| 451541 ||  || — || December 21, 2003 || Kitt Peak || Spacewatch || — || align=right data-sort-value="0.82" | 820 m || 
|-id=542 bgcolor=#E9E9E9
| 451542 ||  || — || August 28, 2006 || Siding Spring || SSS || JUN || align=right | 1.2 km || 
|-id=543 bgcolor=#E9E9E9
| 451543 ||  || — || August 19, 2006 || Anderson Mesa || LONEOS || — || align=right | 1.7 km || 
|-id=544 bgcolor=#E9E9E9
| 451544 ||  || — || November 18, 2011 || Kitt Peak || Spacewatch || (5) || align=right data-sort-value="0.78" | 780 m || 
|-id=545 bgcolor=#E9E9E9
| 451545 ||  || — || October 28, 2011 || Kitt Peak || Spacewatch || — || align=right data-sort-value="0.80" | 800 m || 
|-id=546 bgcolor=#E9E9E9
| 451546 ||  || — || October 24, 2011 || Kitt Peak || Spacewatch || — || align=right data-sort-value="0.81" | 810 m || 
|-id=547 bgcolor=#E9E9E9
| 451547 ||  || — || December 27, 2003 || Socorro || LINEAR || — || align=right data-sort-value="0.94" | 940 m || 
|-id=548 bgcolor=#E9E9E9
| 451548 ||  || — || November 11, 2007 || Mount Lemmon || Mount Lemmon Survey || — || align=right data-sort-value="0.88" | 880 m || 
|-id=549 bgcolor=#E9E9E9
| 451549 ||  || — || December 17, 2007 || Mount Lemmon || Mount Lemmon Survey || — || align=right | 1.0 km || 
|-id=550 bgcolor=#E9E9E9
| 451550 ||  || — || November 5, 2007 || Kitt Peak || Spacewatch || — || align=right data-sort-value="0.80" | 800 m || 
|-id=551 bgcolor=#E9E9E9
| 451551 ||  || — || October 28, 2011 || Mount Lemmon || Mount Lemmon Survey || — || align=right | 1.9 km || 
|-id=552 bgcolor=#E9E9E9
| 451552 ||  || — || November 24, 2003 || Kitt Peak || Spacewatch || — || align=right data-sort-value="0.71" | 710 m || 
|-id=553 bgcolor=#E9E9E9
| 451553 ||  || — || November 16, 2011 || Kitt Peak || Spacewatch || — || align=right | 1.1 km || 
|-id=554 bgcolor=#E9E9E9
| 451554 ||  || — || May 30, 2009 || Mount Lemmon || Mount Lemmon Survey || — || align=right | 2.3 km || 
|-id=555 bgcolor=#E9E9E9
| 451555 ||  || — || December 30, 2007 || Kitt Peak || Spacewatch || (5) || align=right data-sort-value="0.68" | 680 m || 
|-id=556 bgcolor=#E9E9E9
| 451556 ||  || — || January 21, 1996 || Kitt Peak || Spacewatch || — || align=right | 1.1 km || 
|-id=557 bgcolor=#E9E9E9
| 451557 ||  || — || November 18, 2011 || Mount Lemmon || Mount Lemmon Survey || — || align=right data-sort-value="0.99" | 990 m || 
|-id=558 bgcolor=#E9E9E9
| 451558 ||  || — || November 6, 2007 || Mount Lemmon || Mount Lemmon Survey || EUN || align=right | 1.3 km || 
|-id=559 bgcolor=#E9E9E9
| 451559 ||  || — || January 12, 2008 || Mount Lemmon || Mount Lemmon Survey || — || align=right | 1.7 km || 
|-id=560 bgcolor=#E9E9E9
| 451560 ||  || — || November 26, 1998 || Kitt Peak || Spacewatch || — || align=right | 1.3 km || 
|-id=561 bgcolor=#E9E9E9
| 451561 ||  || — || September 17, 2010 || Mount Lemmon || Mount Lemmon Survey || — || align=right | 2.0 km || 
|-id=562 bgcolor=#E9E9E9
| 451562 ||  || — || February 8, 2008 || Mount Lemmon || Mount Lemmon Survey || — || align=right | 1.1 km || 
|-id=563 bgcolor=#E9E9E9
| 451563 ||  || — || September 27, 2006 || Catalina || CSS || — || align=right | 1.2 km || 
|-id=564 bgcolor=#E9E9E9
| 451564 ||  || — || November 2, 2007 || Kitt Peak || Spacewatch || — || align=right | 1.5 km || 
|-id=565 bgcolor=#d6d6d6
| 451565 ||  || — || November 27, 2011 || Mount Lemmon || Mount Lemmon Survey || EOS || align=right | 2.2 km || 
|-id=566 bgcolor=#E9E9E9
| 451566 ||  || — || December 31, 2011 || Kitt Peak || Spacewatch || — || align=right | 2.2 km || 
|-id=567 bgcolor=#E9E9E9
| 451567 ||  || — || September 3, 2010 || Socorro || LINEAR || — || align=right | 2.5 km || 
|-id=568 bgcolor=#E9E9E9
| 451568 ||  || — || January 20, 2008 || Mount Lemmon || Mount Lemmon Survey || — || align=right | 1.8 km || 
|-id=569 bgcolor=#E9E9E9
| 451569 ||  || — || January 24, 2004 || Socorro || LINEAR || — || align=right | 1.4 km || 
|-id=570 bgcolor=#d6d6d6
| 451570 ||  || — || November 28, 2005 || Kitt Peak || Spacewatch || — || align=right | 3.9 km || 
|-id=571 bgcolor=#E9E9E9
| 451571 ||  || — || November 18, 2011 || Mount Lemmon || Mount Lemmon Survey || — || align=right | 1.4 km || 
|-id=572 bgcolor=#E9E9E9
| 451572 ||  || — || December 21, 2003 || Kitt Peak || Spacewatch || — || align=right | 1.1 km || 
|-id=573 bgcolor=#E9E9E9
| 451573 ||  || — || November 16, 2006 || Catalina || CSS || — || align=right | 2.1 km || 
|-id=574 bgcolor=#FA8072
| 451574 ||  || — || December 3, 2003 || Anderson Mesa || LONEOS || — || align=right | 1.2 km || 
|-id=575 bgcolor=#E9E9E9
| 451575 ||  || — || June 28, 2010 || WISE || WISE || HOF || align=right | 3.8 km || 
|-id=576 bgcolor=#E9E9E9
| 451576 ||  || — || December 27, 2011 || Kitt Peak || Spacewatch || — || align=right | 1.9 km || 
|-id=577 bgcolor=#E9E9E9
| 451577 ||  || — || September 25, 2006 || Mount Lemmon || Mount Lemmon Survey || MIS || align=right | 2.2 km || 
|-id=578 bgcolor=#d6d6d6
| 451578 ||  || — || March 23, 2007 || Siding Spring || SSS || — || align=right | 4.3 km || 
|-id=579 bgcolor=#E9E9E9
| 451579 ||  || — || February 10, 2008 || Catalina || CSS || — || align=right | 1.7 km || 
|-id=580 bgcolor=#E9E9E9
| 451580 ||  || — || November 27, 1998 || Kitt Peak || Spacewatch || RAF || align=right data-sort-value="0.92" | 920 m || 
|-id=581 bgcolor=#E9E9E9
| 451581 ||  || — || October 22, 2006 || Kitt Peak || Spacewatch || — || align=right | 1.8 km || 
|-id=582 bgcolor=#E9E9E9
| 451582 ||  || — || January 18, 2012 || Kitt Peak || Spacewatch || — || align=right | 1.3 km || 
|-id=583 bgcolor=#E9E9E9
| 451583 ||  || — || January 7, 2003 || Socorro || LINEAR || — || align=right | 1.6 km || 
|-id=584 bgcolor=#d6d6d6
| 451584 ||  || — || December 28, 2011 || Mount Lemmon || Mount Lemmon Survey || — || align=right | 4.0 km || 
|-id=585 bgcolor=#E9E9E9
| 451585 ||  || — || November 18, 2006 || Kitt Peak || Spacewatch || HOF || align=right | 2.5 km || 
|-id=586 bgcolor=#E9E9E9
| 451586 ||  || — || March 27, 2008 || Mount Lemmon || Mount Lemmon Survey || AGN || align=right | 1.1 km || 
|-id=587 bgcolor=#E9E9E9
| 451587 ||  || — || October 21, 2006 || Mount Lemmon || Mount Lemmon Survey || — || align=right | 1.4 km || 
|-id=588 bgcolor=#E9E9E9
| 451588 ||  || — || June 8, 2005 || Kitt Peak || Spacewatch || — || align=right | 2.3 km || 
|-id=589 bgcolor=#E9E9E9
| 451589 ||  || — || September 30, 2006 || Catalina || CSS || — || align=right | 1.5 km || 
|-id=590 bgcolor=#E9E9E9
| 451590 ||  || — || January 2, 2012 || Mount Lemmon || Mount Lemmon Survey || — || align=right | 2.4 km || 
|-id=591 bgcolor=#d6d6d6
| 451591 ||  || — || February 17, 2007 || Mount Lemmon || Mount Lemmon Survey || EOS || align=right | 2.0 km || 
|-id=592 bgcolor=#E9E9E9
| 451592 ||  || — || September 3, 2010 || Mount Lemmon || Mount Lemmon Survey || — || align=right | 1.4 km || 
|-id=593 bgcolor=#E9E9E9
| 451593 ||  || — || August 23, 2001 || Kitt Peak || Spacewatch || DOR || align=right | 1.9 km || 
|-id=594 bgcolor=#d6d6d6
| 451594 ||  || — || January 18, 2012 || Kitt Peak || Spacewatch || — || align=right | 1.5 km || 
|-id=595 bgcolor=#E9E9E9
| 451595 ||  || — || November 11, 2006 || Kitt Peak || Spacewatch || — || align=right | 3.1 km || 
|-id=596 bgcolor=#d6d6d6
| 451596 ||  || — || January 31, 2012 || Mount Lemmon || Mount Lemmon Survey || — || align=right | 3.2 km || 
|-id=597 bgcolor=#d6d6d6
| 451597 ||  || — || February 1, 2012 || Kitt Peak || Spacewatch || VER || align=right | 2.2 km || 
|-id=598 bgcolor=#E9E9E9
| 451598 ||  || — || September 15, 2006 || Kitt Peak || Spacewatch || — || align=right data-sort-value="0.86" | 860 m || 
|-id=599 bgcolor=#d6d6d6
| 451599 ||  || — || January 19, 2012 || Kitt Peak || Spacewatch || — || align=right | 2.1 km || 
|-id=600 bgcolor=#d6d6d6
| 451600 ||  || — || March 10, 2007 || Kitt Peak || Spacewatch || — || align=right | 2.2 km || 
|}

451601–451700 

|-bgcolor=#d6d6d6
| 451601 ||  || — || September 19, 2009 || Kitt Peak || Spacewatch || EOS || align=right | 2.0 km || 
|-id=602 bgcolor=#E9E9E9
| 451602 ||  || — || October 11, 2010 || Mount Lemmon || Mount Lemmon Survey || — || align=right | 2.1 km || 
|-id=603 bgcolor=#d6d6d6
| 451603 ||  || — || October 10, 2004 || Kitt Peak || Spacewatch || — || align=right | 2.7 km || 
|-id=604 bgcolor=#d6d6d6
| 451604 ||  || — || January 30, 2012 || Kitt Peak || Spacewatch || — || align=right | 2.6 km || 
|-id=605 bgcolor=#d6d6d6
| 451605 ||  || — || January 30, 2012 || Kitt Peak || Spacewatch || — || align=right | 2.6 km || 
|-id=606 bgcolor=#d6d6d6
| 451606 ||  || — || February 21, 2012 || Mount Lemmon || Mount Lemmon Survey || — || align=right | 3.0 km || 
|-id=607 bgcolor=#d6d6d6
| 451607 ||  || — || April 22, 2007 || Catalina || CSS || — || align=right | 3.6 km || 
|-id=608 bgcolor=#E9E9E9
| 451608 ||  || — || April 26, 2008 || Kitt Peak || Spacewatch || — || align=right | 2.4 km || 
|-id=609 bgcolor=#d6d6d6
| 451609 ||  || — || January 18, 2012 || Kitt Peak || Spacewatch || — || align=right | 2.7 km || 
|-id=610 bgcolor=#d6d6d6
| 451610 ||  || — || September 15, 2009 || Kitt Peak || Spacewatch || — || align=right | 3.4 km || 
|-id=611 bgcolor=#d6d6d6
| 451611 ||  || — || March 16, 2007 || Kitt Peak || Spacewatch || — || align=right | 2.5 km || 
|-id=612 bgcolor=#d6d6d6
| 451612 ||  || — || December 28, 2005 || Kitt Peak || Spacewatch || THM || align=right | 2.0 km || 
|-id=613 bgcolor=#d6d6d6
| 451613 ||  || — || February 25, 2012 || Mount Lemmon || Mount Lemmon Survey || EOS || align=right | 1.7 km || 
|-id=614 bgcolor=#d6d6d6
| 451614 ||  || — || February 21, 2012 || Kitt Peak || Spacewatch || — || align=right | 2.3 km || 
|-id=615 bgcolor=#d6d6d6
| 451615 ||  || — || September 15, 2004 || Kitt Peak || Spacewatch || — || align=right | 2.4 km || 
|-id=616 bgcolor=#d6d6d6
| 451616 ||  || — || February 23, 2012 || Mount Lemmon || Mount Lemmon Survey || — || align=right | 3.2 km || 
|-id=617 bgcolor=#d6d6d6
| 451617 ||  || — || March 11, 2007 || Mount Lemmon || Mount Lemmon Survey || — || align=right | 2.3 km || 
|-id=618 bgcolor=#d6d6d6
| 451618 ||  || — || January 27, 2012 || Mount Lemmon || Mount Lemmon Survey || — || align=right | 2.8 km || 
|-id=619 bgcolor=#d6d6d6
| 451619 ||  || — || November 17, 2009 || Mount Lemmon || Mount Lemmon Survey || — || align=right | 3.6 km || 
|-id=620 bgcolor=#d6d6d6
| 451620 ||  || — || February 22, 2012 || Kitt Peak || Spacewatch || — || align=right | 2.7 km || 
|-id=621 bgcolor=#d6d6d6
| 451621 ||  || — || October 16, 2009 || Mount Lemmon || Mount Lemmon Survey || THB || align=right | 3.1 km || 
|-id=622 bgcolor=#d6d6d6
| 451622 ||  || — || September 27, 2009 || Kitt Peak || Spacewatch || — || align=right | 2.4 km || 
|-id=623 bgcolor=#d6d6d6
| 451623 ||  || — || March 16, 2012 || Mount Lemmon || Mount Lemmon Survey || — || align=right | 3.5 km || 
|-id=624 bgcolor=#d6d6d6
| 451624 ||  || — || September 18, 2009 || Kitt Peak || Spacewatch || — || align=right | 3.1 km || 
|-id=625 bgcolor=#d6d6d6
| 451625 ||  || — || October 10, 2004 || Kitt Peak || Spacewatch || — || align=right | 3.9 km || 
|-id=626 bgcolor=#d6d6d6
| 451626 ||  || — || March 26, 2007 || Kitt Peak || Spacewatch || — || align=right | 2.5 km || 
|-id=627 bgcolor=#d6d6d6
| 451627 ||  || — || June 8, 2007 || Kitt Peak || Spacewatch || — || align=right | 3.0 km || 
|-id=628 bgcolor=#d6d6d6
| 451628 ||  || — || October 7, 2004 || Kitt Peak || Spacewatch || — || align=right | 2.3 km || 
|-id=629 bgcolor=#d6d6d6
| 451629 ||  || — || October 15, 2009 || Mount Lemmon || Mount Lemmon Survey || — || align=right | 2.7 km || 
|-id=630 bgcolor=#d6d6d6
| 451630 ||  || — || December 3, 2010 || Catalina || CSS || — || align=right | 4.3 km || 
|-id=631 bgcolor=#d6d6d6
| 451631 ||  || — || October 16, 2009 || Mount Lemmon || Mount Lemmon Survey || — || align=right | 2.9 km || 
|-id=632 bgcolor=#d6d6d6
| 451632 ||  || — || September 22, 2009 || Kitt Peak || Spacewatch || — || align=right | 3.6 km || 
|-id=633 bgcolor=#d6d6d6
| 451633 ||  || — || March 14, 2012 || Kitt Peak || Spacewatch || LIX || align=right | 4.6 km || 
|-id=634 bgcolor=#d6d6d6
| 451634 ||  || — || February 20, 2001 || Socorro || LINEAR || — || align=right | 2.6 km || 
|-id=635 bgcolor=#d6d6d6
| 451635 ||  || — || October 14, 2009 || Mount Lemmon || Mount Lemmon Survey || — || align=right | 2.6 km || 
|-id=636 bgcolor=#d6d6d6
| 451636 ||  || — || February 27, 2006 || Kitt Peak || Spacewatch || LIX || align=right | 3.3 km || 
|-id=637 bgcolor=#d6d6d6
| 451637 ||  || — || September 25, 2009 || Kitt Peak || Spacewatch || — || align=right | 2.9 km || 
|-id=638 bgcolor=#d6d6d6
| 451638 ||  || — || January 26, 2006 || Kitt Peak || Spacewatch || — || align=right | 2.7 km || 
|-id=639 bgcolor=#d6d6d6
| 451639 ||  || — || December 8, 2004 || Socorro || LINEAR || — || align=right | 4.0 km || 
|-id=640 bgcolor=#d6d6d6
| 451640 ||  || — || November 11, 2004 || Kitt Peak || Spacewatch || — || align=right | 2.8 km || 
|-id=641 bgcolor=#d6d6d6
| 451641 ||  || — || January 27, 2006 || Mount Lemmon || Mount Lemmon Survey || — || align=right | 2.5 km || 
|-id=642 bgcolor=#E9E9E9
| 451642 ||  || — || April 25, 2003 || Kitt Peak || Spacewatch || — || align=right | 2.8 km || 
|-id=643 bgcolor=#d6d6d6
| 451643 ||  || — || March 9, 2006 || Catalina || CSS || — || align=right | 3.8 km || 
|-id=644 bgcolor=#d6d6d6
| 451644 ||  || — || January 20, 2010 || WISE || WISE || Tj (2.99) || align=right | 3.8 km || 
|-id=645 bgcolor=#d6d6d6
| 451645 ||  || — || March 24, 2001 || Anderson Mesa || LONEOS || — || align=right | 3.0 km || 
|-id=646 bgcolor=#d6d6d6
| 451646 ||  || — || November 17, 2010 || Mount Lemmon || Mount Lemmon Survey || LIX || align=right | 3.2 km || 
|-id=647 bgcolor=#d6d6d6
| 451647 ||  || — || November 26, 2009 || Mount Lemmon || Mount Lemmon Survey || — || align=right | 4.1 km || 
|-id=648 bgcolor=#d6d6d6
| 451648 ||  || — || December 24, 2005 || Kitt Peak || Spacewatch || — || align=right | 2.6 km || 
|-id=649 bgcolor=#fefefe
| 451649 ||  || — || January 8, 2006 || Mount Lemmon || Mount Lemmon Survey || H || align=right data-sort-value="0.61" | 610 m || 
|-id=650 bgcolor=#fefefe
| 451650 ||  || — || November 9, 2009 || Kitt Peak || Spacewatch || — || align=right data-sort-value="0.59" | 590 m || 
|-id=651 bgcolor=#fefefe
| 451651 ||  || — || September 16, 2012 || Catalina || CSS || H || align=right data-sort-value="0.65" | 650 m || 
|-id=652 bgcolor=#fefefe
| 451652 ||  || — || September 15, 2012 || Kitt Peak || Spacewatch || H || align=right data-sort-value="0.53" | 530 m || 
|-id=653 bgcolor=#fefefe
| 451653 ||  || — || October 8, 2012 || Kitt Peak || Spacewatch || — || align=right data-sort-value="0.50" | 500 m || 
|-id=654 bgcolor=#fefefe
| 451654 ||  || — || September 23, 2012 || Mount Lemmon || Mount Lemmon Survey || — || align=right data-sort-value="0.60" | 600 m || 
|-id=655 bgcolor=#fefefe
| 451655 ||  || — || November 13, 2012 || Mount Lemmon || Mount Lemmon Survey || — || align=right data-sort-value="0.66" | 660 m || 
|-id=656 bgcolor=#fefefe
| 451656 ||  || — || March 29, 2011 || Kitt Peak || Spacewatch || — || align=right data-sort-value="0.68" | 680 m || 
|-id=657 bgcolor=#C2E0FF
| 451657 ||  || — || November 19, 2012 || Cerro Tololo Obs. || CTIO-DECam || SDOcritical || align=right | 190 km || 
|-id=658 bgcolor=#fefefe
| 451658 ||  || — || March 12, 2010 || Kitt Peak || Spacewatch || — || align=right | 1.0 km || 
|-id=659 bgcolor=#fefefe
| 451659 ||  || — || January 5, 2002 || Kitt Peak || Spacewatch || — || align=right | 1.2 km || 
|-id=660 bgcolor=#fefefe
| 451660 ||  || — || January 25, 2006 || Kitt Peak || Spacewatch || V || align=right data-sort-value="0.70" | 700 m || 
|-id=661 bgcolor=#fefefe
| 451661 ||  || — || September 21, 2008 || Kitt Peak || Spacewatch || — || align=right data-sort-value="0.90" | 900 m || 
|-id=662 bgcolor=#fefefe
| 451662 ||  || — || September 24, 2011 || Mount Lemmon || Mount Lemmon Survey || — || align=right data-sort-value="0.98" | 980 m || 
|-id=663 bgcolor=#fefefe
| 451663 ||  || — || October 21, 2008 || Kitt Peak || Spacewatch || — || align=right data-sort-value="0.83" | 830 m || 
|-id=664 bgcolor=#fefefe
| 451664 ||  || — || January 8, 2006 || Mount Lemmon || Mount Lemmon Survey || — || align=right data-sort-value="0.64" | 640 m || 
|-id=665 bgcolor=#fefefe
| 451665 ||  || — || November 10, 2005 || Kitt Peak || Spacewatch || — || align=right data-sort-value="0.64" | 640 m || 
|-id=666 bgcolor=#fefefe
| 451666 ||  || — || December 26, 2005 || Kitt Peak || Spacewatch || — || align=right data-sort-value="0.92" | 920 m || 
|-id=667 bgcolor=#fefefe
| 451667 ||  || — || December 2, 2008 || Kitt Peak || Spacewatch || — || align=right data-sort-value="0.90" | 900 m || 
|-id=668 bgcolor=#fefefe
| 451668 ||  || — || September 23, 2008 || Mount Lemmon || Mount Lemmon Survey || — || align=right data-sort-value="0.73" | 730 m || 
|-id=669 bgcolor=#fefefe
| 451669 ||  || — || November 13, 2012 || Mount Lemmon || Mount Lemmon Survey || — || align=right data-sort-value="0.74" | 740 m || 
|-id=670 bgcolor=#fefefe
| 451670 ||  || — || September 3, 2008 || Kitt Peak || Spacewatch || — || align=right data-sort-value="0.69" | 690 m || 
|-id=671 bgcolor=#fefefe
| 451671 ||  || — || October 10, 2008 || Mount Lemmon || Mount Lemmon Survey || — || align=right | 1.8 km || 
|-id=672 bgcolor=#E9E9E9
| 451672 ||  || — || January 20, 2009 || Catalina || CSS || — || align=right | 1.3 km || 
|-id=673 bgcolor=#fefefe
| 451673 ||  || — || August 24, 2007 || Kitt Peak || Spacewatch || V || align=right data-sort-value="0.72" | 720 m || 
|-id=674 bgcolor=#fefefe
| 451674 ||  || — || December 2, 2005 || Mount Lemmon || Mount Lemmon Survey || — || align=right data-sort-value="0.93" | 930 m || 
|-id=675 bgcolor=#fefefe
| 451675 ||  || — || October 25, 2008 || Kitt Peak || Spacewatch || — || align=right data-sort-value="0.71" | 710 m || 
|-id=676 bgcolor=#fefefe
| 451676 ||  || — || March 13, 2010 || Mount Lemmon || Mount Lemmon Survey || — || align=right data-sort-value="0.61" | 610 m || 
|-id=677 bgcolor=#fefefe
| 451677 ||  || — || February 6, 2010 || Kitt Peak || Spacewatch || (1338) || align=right data-sort-value="0.86" | 860 m || 
|-id=678 bgcolor=#fefefe
| 451678 ||  || — || February 7, 2006 || Kitt Peak || Spacewatch || — || align=right | 1.8 km || 
|-id=679 bgcolor=#E9E9E9
| 451679 ||  || — || June 16, 2010 || Mount Lemmon || Mount Lemmon Survey || — || align=right data-sort-value="0.89" | 890 m || 
|-id=680 bgcolor=#fefefe
| 451680 ||  || — || December 5, 2008 || Kitt Peak || Spacewatch || — || align=right data-sort-value="0.94" | 940 m || 
|-id=681 bgcolor=#fefefe
| 451681 ||  || — || December 5, 2008 || Kitt Peak || Spacewatch || V || align=right data-sort-value="0.55" | 550 m || 
|-id=682 bgcolor=#fefefe
| 451682 ||  || — || July 18, 2007 || Mount Lemmon || Mount Lemmon Survey || — || align=right | 1.0 km || 
|-id=683 bgcolor=#fefefe
| 451683 ||  || — || December 29, 2008 || Kitt Peak || Spacewatch || — || align=right data-sort-value="0.86" | 860 m || 
|-id=684 bgcolor=#fefefe
| 451684 ||  || — || January 31, 2006 || Kitt Peak || Spacewatch || — || align=right data-sort-value="0.53" | 530 m || 
|-id=685 bgcolor=#E9E9E9
| 451685 ||  || — || January 9, 2013 || Kitt Peak || Spacewatch || — || align=right | 1.5 km || 
|-id=686 bgcolor=#fefefe
| 451686 ||  || — || November 30, 2008 || Mount Lemmon || Mount Lemmon Survey || — || align=right data-sort-value="0.83" | 830 m || 
|-id=687 bgcolor=#fefefe
| 451687 ||  || — || December 5, 2008 || Kitt Peak || Spacewatch || — || align=right data-sort-value="0.87" | 870 m || 
|-id=688 bgcolor=#fefefe
| 451688 ||  || — || December 6, 2005 || Kitt Peak || Spacewatch || — || align=right data-sort-value="0.78" | 780 m || 
|-id=689 bgcolor=#fefefe
| 451689 ||  || — || February 22, 2010 || WISE || WISE || — || align=right | 2.1 km || 
|-id=690 bgcolor=#fefefe
| 451690 ||  || — || January 5, 2013 || Kitt Peak || Spacewatch || — || align=right data-sort-value="0.86" | 860 m || 
|-id=691 bgcolor=#fefefe
| 451691 ||  || — || February 27, 2006 || Mount Lemmon || Mount Lemmon Survey || NYS || align=right data-sort-value="0.50" | 500 m || 
|-id=692 bgcolor=#fefefe
| 451692 ||  || — || October 27, 2008 || Kitt Peak || Spacewatch || — || align=right data-sort-value="0.70" | 700 m || 
|-id=693 bgcolor=#fefefe
| 451693 ||  || — || January 25, 2006 || Kitt Peak || Spacewatch || — || align=right data-sort-value="0.52" | 520 m || 
|-id=694 bgcolor=#fefefe
| 451694 ||  || — || April 10, 2010 || Mount Lemmon || Mount Lemmon Survey || — || align=right data-sort-value="0.72" | 720 m || 
|-id=695 bgcolor=#fefefe
| 451695 ||  || — || January 1, 2009 || Mount Lemmon || Mount Lemmon Survey || — || align=right data-sort-value="0.98" | 980 m || 
|-id=696 bgcolor=#fefefe
| 451696 ||  || — || December 12, 2012 || Kitt Peak || Spacewatch || — || align=right data-sort-value="0.66" | 660 m || 
|-id=697 bgcolor=#fefefe
| 451697 ||  || — || December 23, 2001 || Kitt Peak || Spacewatch || V || align=right data-sort-value="0.62" | 620 m || 
|-id=698 bgcolor=#fefefe
| 451698 ||  || — || September 12, 2004 || Kitt Peak || Spacewatch || — || align=right data-sort-value="0.64" | 640 m || 
|-id=699 bgcolor=#fefefe
| 451699 ||  || — || September 25, 2008 || Mount Lemmon || Mount Lemmon Survey || — || align=right data-sort-value="0.63" | 630 m || 
|-id=700 bgcolor=#E9E9E9
| 451700 ||  || — || March 1, 2009 || Mount Lemmon || Mount Lemmon Survey || — || align=right | 1.1 km || 
|}

451701–451800 

|-bgcolor=#fefefe
| 451701 ||  || — || December 21, 2008 || Kitt Peak || Spacewatch || — || align=right data-sort-value="0.73" | 730 m || 
|-id=702 bgcolor=#E9E9E9
| 451702 ||  || — || March 10, 2005 || Mount Lemmon || Mount Lemmon Survey || — || align=right data-sort-value="0.79" | 790 m || 
|-id=703 bgcolor=#fefefe
| 451703 ||  || — || October 30, 2008 || Mount Lemmon || Mount Lemmon Survey || — || align=right data-sort-value="0.55" | 550 m || 
|-id=704 bgcolor=#E9E9E9
| 451704 ||  || — || November 18, 2011 || Mount Lemmon || Mount Lemmon Survey || — || align=right | 1.5 km || 
|-id=705 bgcolor=#fefefe
| 451705 ||  || — || January 7, 2013 || Kitt Peak || Spacewatch || — || align=right data-sort-value="0.90" | 900 m || 
|-id=706 bgcolor=#E9E9E9
| 451706 ||  || — || February 6, 2013 || Kitt Peak || Spacewatch || MAR || align=right data-sort-value="0.95" | 950 m || 
|-id=707 bgcolor=#fefefe
| 451707 ||  || — || December 2, 2008 || Kitt Peak || Spacewatch || — || align=right data-sort-value="0.70" | 700 m || 
|-id=708 bgcolor=#fefefe
| 451708 ||  || — || October 19, 2011 || Mount Lemmon || Mount Lemmon Survey || — || align=right data-sort-value="0.84" | 840 m || 
|-id=709 bgcolor=#E9E9E9
| 451709 ||  || — || December 19, 2007 || Kitt Peak || Spacewatch || — || align=right | 1.4 km || 
|-id=710 bgcolor=#E9E9E9
| 451710 ||  || — || November 3, 2011 || Mount Lemmon || Mount Lemmon Survey || — || align=right | 1.5 km || 
|-id=711 bgcolor=#fefefe
| 451711 ||  || — || October 8, 2008 || Mount Lemmon || Mount Lemmon Survey || — || align=right data-sort-value="0.68" | 680 m || 
|-id=712 bgcolor=#fefefe
| 451712 ||  || — || October 7, 2004 || Kitt Peak || Spacewatch || — || align=right | 1.1 km || 
|-id=713 bgcolor=#fefefe
| 451713 ||  || — || October 25, 2008 || Kitt Peak || Spacewatch || — || align=right data-sort-value="0.57" | 570 m || 
|-id=714 bgcolor=#fefefe
| 451714 ||  || — || January 11, 2002 || Kitt Peak || Spacewatch || MAS || align=right data-sort-value="0.70" | 700 m || 
|-id=715 bgcolor=#fefefe
| 451715 ||  || — || December 22, 2008 || Kitt Peak || Spacewatch || MAS || align=right data-sort-value="0.63" | 630 m || 
|-id=716 bgcolor=#fefefe
| 451716 ||  || — || November 18, 2008 || Kitt Peak || Spacewatch || — || align=right data-sort-value="0.59" | 590 m || 
|-id=717 bgcolor=#fefefe
| 451717 ||  || — || February 13, 2002 || Kitt Peak || Spacewatch || V || align=right data-sort-value="0.59" | 590 m || 
|-id=718 bgcolor=#fefefe
| 451718 ||  || — || September 7, 2011 || Kitt Peak || Spacewatch || — || align=right data-sort-value="0.78" | 780 m || 
|-id=719 bgcolor=#fefefe
| 451719 ||  || — || February 7, 2002 || Kitt Peak || Spacewatch || — || align=right data-sort-value="0.81" | 810 m || 
|-id=720 bgcolor=#fefefe
| 451720 ||  || — || December 31, 2008 || Mount Lemmon || Mount Lemmon Survey || — || align=right data-sort-value="0.67" | 670 m || 
|-id=721 bgcolor=#fefefe
| 451721 ||  || — || January 4, 2006 || Mount Lemmon || Mount Lemmon Survey || — || align=right data-sort-value="0.61" | 610 m || 
|-id=722 bgcolor=#fefefe
| 451722 ||  || — || February 1, 2013 || Kitt Peak || Spacewatch || — || align=right data-sort-value="0.93" | 930 m || 
|-id=723 bgcolor=#E9E9E9
| 451723 ||  || — || January 15, 2008 || Mount Lemmon || Mount Lemmon Survey || — || align=right | 2.2 km || 
|-id=724 bgcolor=#fefefe
| 451724 ||  || — || January 16, 2009 || Mount Lemmon || Mount Lemmon Survey || — || align=right data-sort-value="0.68" | 680 m || 
|-id=725 bgcolor=#fefefe
| 451725 ||  || — || September 10, 2007 || Kitt Peak || Spacewatch || — || align=right | 1.0 km || 
|-id=726 bgcolor=#E9E9E9
| 451726 ||  || — || September 19, 2006 || Kitt Peak || Spacewatch || — || align=right | 1.7 km || 
|-id=727 bgcolor=#E9E9E9
| 451727 ||  || — || March 8, 2005 || Mount Lemmon || Mount Lemmon Survey || — || align=right | 1.3 km || 
|-id=728 bgcolor=#fefefe
| 451728 ||  || — || September 24, 2004 || Kitt Peak || Spacewatch || — || align=right data-sort-value="0.72" | 720 m || 
|-id=729 bgcolor=#fefefe
| 451729 ||  || — || January 25, 2009 || Kitt Peak || Spacewatch || — || align=right | 1.0 km || 
|-id=730 bgcolor=#fefefe
| 451730 ||  || — || December 29, 2008 || Kitt Peak || Spacewatch || MAS || align=right data-sort-value="0.71" | 710 m || 
|-id=731 bgcolor=#fefefe
| 451731 ||  || — || January 13, 2013 || Catalina || CSS || — || align=right | 1.1 km || 
|-id=732 bgcolor=#fefefe
| 451732 ||  || — || March 25, 2006 || Kitt Peak || Spacewatch || CLA || align=right | 1.5 km || 
|-id=733 bgcolor=#fefefe
| 451733 ||  || — || December 29, 2008 || Mount Lemmon || Mount Lemmon Survey || — || align=right data-sort-value="0.75" | 750 m || 
|-id=734 bgcolor=#E9E9E9
| 451734 ||  || — || September 27, 2006 || Mount Lemmon || Mount Lemmon Survey || DOR || align=right | 2.6 km || 
|-id=735 bgcolor=#fefefe
| 451735 ||  || — || December 10, 2004 || Kitt Peak || Spacewatch || — || align=right data-sort-value="0.74" | 740 m || 
|-id=736 bgcolor=#fefefe
| 451736 ||  || — || March 5, 2013 || Kitt Peak || Spacewatch || — || align=right data-sort-value="0.74" | 740 m || 
|-id=737 bgcolor=#E9E9E9
| 451737 ||  || — || October 2, 2006 || Mount Lemmon || Mount Lemmon Survey || — || align=right | 2.3 km || 
|-id=738 bgcolor=#fefefe
| 451738 ||  || — || April 26, 2006 || Kitt Peak || Spacewatch || — || align=right data-sort-value="0.72" | 720 m || 
|-id=739 bgcolor=#E9E9E9
| 451739 ||  || — || April 17, 2009 || Kitt Peak || Spacewatch || WIT || align=right data-sort-value="0.99" | 990 m || 
|-id=740 bgcolor=#fefefe
| 451740 ||  || — || February 16, 2013 || Kitt Peak || Spacewatch || — || align=right data-sort-value="0.85" | 850 m || 
|-id=741 bgcolor=#E9E9E9
| 451741 ||  || — || March 1, 2009 || Kitt Peak || Spacewatch || — || align=right data-sort-value="0.90" | 900 m || 
|-id=742 bgcolor=#fefefe
| 451742 ||  || — || January 26, 2006 || Catalina || CSS || V || align=right data-sort-value="0.78" | 780 m || 
|-id=743 bgcolor=#fefefe
| 451743 ||  || — || January 20, 2009 || Catalina || CSS || — || align=right data-sort-value="0.74" | 740 m || 
|-id=744 bgcolor=#E9E9E9
| 451744 ||  || — || October 22, 2011 || Kitt Peak || Spacewatch || — || align=right | 1.4 km || 
|-id=745 bgcolor=#E9E9E9
| 451745 ||  || — || November 17, 1998 || Kitt Peak || Spacewatch || — || align=right | 1.4 km || 
|-id=746 bgcolor=#fefefe
| 451746 ||  || — || January 31, 2009 || Mount Lemmon || Mount Lemmon Survey || — || align=right data-sort-value="0.67" | 670 m || 
|-id=747 bgcolor=#E9E9E9
| 451747 ||  || — || May 7, 2005 || Mount Lemmon || Mount Lemmon Survey || — || align=right | 1.2 km || 
|-id=748 bgcolor=#d6d6d6
| 451748 ||  || — || March 5, 2008 || Mount Lemmon || Mount Lemmon Survey || — || align=right | 2.2 km || 
|-id=749 bgcolor=#fefefe
| 451749 ||  || — || April 2, 2006 || Kitt Peak || Spacewatch || ERI || align=right | 1.5 km || 
|-id=750 bgcolor=#E9E9E9
| 451750 ||  || — || April 23, 2009 || Mount Lemmon || Mount Lemmon Survey || — || align=right | 1.7 km || 
|-id=751 bgcolor=#E9E9E9
| 451751 ||  || — || November 13, 2007 || Mount Lemmon || Mount Lemmon Survey || — || align=right | 1.0 km || 
|-id=752 bgcolor=#E9E9E9
| 451752 ||  || — || December 19, 2003 || Kitt Peak || Spacewatch || — || align=right | 1.4 km || 
|-id=753 bgcolor=#fefefe
| 451753 ||  || — || January 18, 2009 || Kitt Peak || Spacewatch || — || align=right data-sort-value="0.85" | 850 m || 
|-id=754 bgcolor=#fefefe
| 451754 ||  || — || December 18, 2001 || Kitt Peak || Spacewatch || — || align=right data-sort-value="0.66" | 660 m || 
|-id=755 bgcolor=#fefefe
| 451755 ||  || — || January 16, 2009 || Kitt Peak || Spacewatch || — || align=right data-sort-value="0.79" | 790 m || 
|-id=756 bgcolor=#fefefe
| 451756 ||  || — || September 26, 2011 || Mount Lemmon || Mount Lemmon Survey || — || align=right | 1.0 km || 
|-id=757 bgcolor=#E9E9E9
| 451757 ||  || — || October 12, 2007 || Mount Lemmon || Mount Lemmon Survey || — || align=right data-sort-value="0.89" | 890 m || 
|-id=758 bgcolor=#E9E9E9
| 451758 ||  || — || November 17, 2006 || Mount Lemmon || Mount Lemmon Survey || DOR || align=right | 2.4 km || 
|-id=759 bgcolor=#fefefe
| 451759 ||  || — || February 28, 2009 || Mount Lemmon || Mount Lemmon Survey || — || align=right data-sort-value="0.68" | 680 m || 
|-id=760 bgcolor=#fefefe
| 451760 ||  || — || October 13, 2007 || Mount Lemmon || Mount Lemmon Survey || — || align=right data-sort-value="0.82" | 820 m || 
|-id=761 bgcolor=#d6d6d6
| 451761 ||  || — || October 10, 2004 || Kitt Peak || Spacewatch || — || align=right | 3.2 km || 
|-id=762 bgcolor=#E9E9E9
| 451762 ||  || — || March 9, 2008 || Mount Lemmon || Mount Lemmon Survey || — || align=right | 2.2 km || 
|-id=763 bgcolor=#d6d6d6
| 451763 ||  || — || June 17, 2009 || Kitt Peak || Spacewatch || EOS || align=right | 1.7 km || 
|-id=764 bgcolor=#E9E9E9
| 451764 ||  || — || October 27, 2006 || Mount Lemmon || Mount Lemmon Survey || — || align=right | 1.9 km || 
|-id=765 bgcolor=#E9E9E9
| 451765 ||  || — || March 10, 2005 || Mount Lemmon || Mount Lemmon Survey || MAR || align=right | 1.1 km || 
|-id=766 bgcolor=#d6d6d6
| 451766 ||  || — || March 9, 2007 || Mount Lemmon || Mount Lemmon Survey || — || align=right | 3.4 km || 
|-id=767 bgcolor=#E9E9E9
| 451767 ||  || — || December 15, 1998 || Caussols || ODAS || — || align=right | 1.5 km || 
|-id=768 bgcolor=#E9E9E9
| 451768 ||  || — || November 2, 2007 || Kitt Peak || Spacewatch || — || align=right data-sort-value="0.79" | 790 m || 
|-id=769 bgcolor=#fefefe
| 451769 ||  || — || December 3, 2008 || Mount Lemmon || Mount Lemmon Survey || — || align=right data-sort-value="0.72" | 720 m || 
|-id=770 bgcolor=#E9E9E9
| 451770 ||  || — || April 2, 2009 || Mount Lemmon || Mount Lemmon Survey || EUN || align=right | 1.2 km || 
|-id=771 bgcolor=#E9E9E9
| 451771 ||  || — || April 12, 2005 || Mount Lemmon || Mount Lemmon Survey || — || align=right | 1.2 km || 
|-id=772 bgcolor=#d6d6d6
| 451772 ||  || — || May 3, 2008 || Mount Lemmon || Mount Lemmon Survey || — || align=right | 2.4 km || 
|-id=773 bgcolor=#E9E9E9
| 451773 ||  || — || January 14, 2008 || Kitt Peak || Spacewatch || — || align=right | 2.5 km || 
|-id=774 bgcolor=#E9E9E9
| 451774 ||  || — || October 23, 2006 || Kitt Peak || Spacewatch || — || align=right | 1.2 km || 
|-id=775 bgcolor=#fefefe
| 451775 ||  || — || April 7, 2006 || Kitt Peak || Spacewatch || — || align=right | 2.5 km || 
|-id=776 bgcolor=#d6d6d6
| 451776 ||  || — || March 13, 2007 || Mount Lemmon || Mount Lemmon Survey || — || align=right | 2.6 km || 
|-id=777 bgcolor=#E9E9E9
| 451777 ||  || — || April 17, 2009 || Catalina || CSS || — || align=right data-sort-value="0.92" | 920 m || 
|-id=778 bgcolor=#fefefe
| 451778 ||  || — || December 11, 2004 || Campo Imperatore || CINEOS || — || align=right data-sort-value="0.86" | 860 m || 
|-id=779 bgcolor=#d6d6d6
| 451779 ||  || — || March 17, 2007 || Catalina || CSS || Tj (2.99) || align=right | 5.1 km || 
|-id=780 bgcolor=#E9E9E9
| 451780 ||  || — || January 28, 2004 || Socorro || LINEAR || — || align=right | 1.8 km || 
|-id=781 bgcolor=#d6d6d6
| 451781 ||  || — || September 21, 2009 || Mount Lemmon || Mount Lemmon Survey || — || align=right | 2.9 km || 
|-id=782 bgcolor=#d6d6d6
| 451782 ||  || — || September 11, 2010 || Mount Lemmon || Mount Lemmon Survey || — || align=right | 4.3 km || 
|-id=783 bgcolor=#d6d6d6
| 451783 ||  || — || September 25, 2009 || Kitt Peak || Spacewatch || Tj (2.99) || align=right | 3.2 km || 
|-id=784 bgcolor=#E9E9E9
| 451784 ||  || — || January 16, 2008 || Mount Lemmon || Mount Lemmon Survey || — || align=right | 2.1 km || 
|-id=785 bgcolor=#d6d6d6
| 451785 ||  || — || October 30, 2010 || Kitt Peak || Spacewatch || — || align=right | 3.7 km || 
|-id=786 bgcolor=#E9E9E9
| 451786 ||  || — || December 13, 2007 || Socorro || LINEAR || — || align=right | 1.0 km || 
|-id=787 bgcolor=#E9E9E9
| 451787 ||  || — || October 14, 2010 || Mount Lemmon || Mount Lemmon Survey || — || align=right | 2.0 km || 
|-id=788 bgcolor=#E9E9E9
| 451788 ||  || — || February 13, 2008 || Kitt Peak || Spacewatch || AGN || align=right | 1.1 km || 
|-id=789 bgcolor=#fefefe
| 451789 ||  || — || September 18, 2003 || Kitt Peak || Spacewatch || — || align=right data-sort-value="0.94" | 940 m || 
|-id=790 bgcolor=#E9E9E9
| 451790 ||  || — || November 11, 2006 || Mount Lemmon || Mount Lemmon Survey || AST || align=right | 1.5 km || 
|-id=791 bgcolor=#d6d6d6
| 451791 ||  || — || April 14, 2013 || Mount Lemmon || Mount Lemmon Survey || EOS || align=right | 2.3 km || 
|-id=792 bgcolor=#d6d6d6
| 451792 ||  || — || October 15, 2004 || Kitt Peak || Spacewatch || — || align=right | 4.1 km || 
|-id=793 bgcolor=#E9E9E9
| 451793 ||  || — || February 3, 2008 || Kitt Peak || Spacewatch || — || align=right | 2.8 km || 
|-id=794 bgcolor=#E9E9E9
| 451794 ||  || — || March 1, 2008 || Mount Lemmon || Mount Lemmon Survey || — || align=right | 1.7 km || 
|-id=795 bgcolor=#d6d6d6
| 451795 ||  || — || February 12, 2012 || Mount Lemmon || Mount Lemmon Survey || — || align=right | 2.6 km || 
|-id=796 bgcolor=#E9E9E9
| 451796 ||  || — || January 18, 2008 || Mount Lemmon || Mount Lemmon Survey || — || align=right | 1.8 km || 
|-id=797 bgcolor=#d6d6d6
| 451797 ||  || — || October 29, 2010 || Mount Lemmon || Mount Lemmon Survey || — || align=right | 3.4 km || 
|-id=798 bgcolor=#E9E9E9
| 451798 ||  || — || April 5, 2000 || Socorro || LINEAR || — || align=right | 1.9 km || 
|-id=799 bgcolor=#E9E9E9
| 451799 ||  || — || September 27, 2006 || Kitt Peak || Spacewatch || — || align=right | 1.1 km || 
|-id=800 bgcolor=#d6d6d6
| 451800 ||  || — || November 25, 2005 || Kitt Peak || Spacewatch || — || align=right | 2.5 km || 
|}

451801–451900 

|-bgcolor=#d6d6d6
| 451801 ||  || — || May 14, 2008 || Mount Lemmon || Mount Lemmon Survey || — || align=right | 3.4 km || 
|-id=802 bgcolor=#d6d6d6
| 451802 ||  || — || September 21, 2009 || Mount Lemmon || Mount Lemmon Survey || — || align=right | 2.4 km || 
|-id=803 bgcolor=#d6d6d6
| 451803 ||  || — || September 25, 2000 || Kitt Peak || Spacewatch || BRA || align=right | 1.6 km || 
|-id=804 bgcolor=#E9E9E9
| 451804 ||  || — || November 25, 2006 || Kitt Peak || Spacewatch || PAD || align=right | 1.4 km || 
|-id=805 bgcolor=#E9E9E9
| 451805 ||  || — || September 10, 2010 || Mount Lemmon || Mount Lemmon Survey || — || align=right | 1.7 km || 
|-id=806 bgcolor=#d6d6d6
| 451806 ||  || — || December 15, 2006 || Kitt Peak || Spacewatch || — || align=right | 1.6 km || 
|-id=807 bgcolor=#E9E9E9
| 451807 ||  || — || March 6, 2008 || Mount Lemmon || Mount Lemmon Survey || — || align=right | 1.5 km || 
|-id=808 bgcolor=#E9E9E9
| 451808 ||  || — || January 19, 2004 || Kitt Peak || Spacewatch || (5) || align=right data-sort-value="0.74" | 740 m || 
|-id=809 bgcolor=#d6d6d6
| 451809 ||  || — || September 22, 2009 || Kitt Peak || Spacewatch || — || align=right | 1.9 km || 
|-id=810 bgcolor=#d6d6d6
| 451810 ||  || — || September 22, 2009 || Kitt Peak || Spacewatch || LIX || align=right | 2.6 km || 
|-id=811 bgcolor=#E9E9E9
| 451811 ||  || — || October 19, 2006 || Mount Lemmon || Mount Lemmon Survey || — || align=right | 1.6 km || 
|-id=812 bgcolor=#E9E9E9
| 451812 ||  || — || February 8, 2008 || Kitt Peak || Spacewatch || — || align=right | 1.8 km || 
|-id=813 bgcolor=#E9E9E9
| 451813 ||  || — || November 2, 2007 || Kitt Peak || Spacewatch || — || align=right data-sort-value="0.85" | 850 m || 
|-id=814 bgcolor=#E9E9E9
| 451814 ||  || — || September 28, 2006 || Mount Lemmon || Mount Lemmon Survey || — || align=right | 1.9 km || 
|-id=815 bgcolor=#E9E9E9
| 451815 ||  || — || September 15, 2010 || Kitt Peak || Spacewatch || HOF || align=right | 2.5 km || 
|-id=816 bgcolor=#d6d6d6
| 451816 ||  || — || October 17, 2010 || Mount Lemmon || Mount Lemmon Survey || — || align=right | 2.3 km || 
|-id=817 bgcolor=#E9E9E9
| 451817 ||  || — || February 12, 2008 || Kitt Peak || Spacewatch || — || align=right | 1.8 km || 
|-id=818 bgcolor=#E9E9E9
| 451818 ||  || — || September 8, 2010 || Kitt Peak || Spacewatch || — || align=right | 1.8 km || 
|-id=819 bgcolor=#d6d6d6
| 451819 ||  || — || April 15, 2008 || Mount Lemmon || Mount Lemmon Survey || — || align=right | 2.3 km || 
|-id=820 bgcolor=#E9E9E9
| 451820 ||  || — || December 16, 2007 || Mount Lemmon || Mount Lemmon Survey || — || align=right | 1.1 km || 
|-id=821 bgcolor=#E9E9E9
| 451821 ||  || — || September 15, 2010 || Kitt Peak || Spacewatch || — || align=right | 1.5 km || 
|-id=822 bgcolor=#d6d6d6
| 451822 ||  || — || August 16, 2009 || Kitt Peak || Spacewatch || THM || align=right | 2.0 km || 
|-id=823 bgcolor=#d6d6d6
| 451823 ||  || — || November 2, 2010 || Mount Lemmon || Mount Lemmon Survey || KOR || align=right | 1.1 km || 
|-id=824 bgcolor=#E9E9E9
| 451824 ||  || — || October 22, 2006 || Kitt Peak || Spacewatch || — || align=right | 1.3 km || 
|-id=825 bgcolor=#E9E9E9
| 451825 ||  || — || November 27, 2006 || Kitt Peak || Spacewatch || — || align=right | 1.6 km || 
|-id=826 bgcolor=#E9E9E9
| 451826 ||  || — || October 31, 2006 || Mount Lemmon || Mount Lemmon Survey || — || align=right | 1.3 km || 
|-id=827 bgcolor=#E9E9E9
| 451827 ||  || — || February 18, 2008 || Mount Lemmon || Mount Lemmon Survey || — || align=right | 2.2 km || 
|-id=828 bgcolor=#E9E9E9
| 451828 ||  || — || October 3, 2010 || Kitt Peak || Spacewatch || — || align=right | 1.7 km || 
|-id=829 bgcolor=#d6d6d6
| 451829 ||  || — || May 9, 2002 || Socorro || LINEAR || — || align=right | 4.5 km || 
|-id=830 bgcolor=#d6d6d6
| 451830 ||  || — || April 11, 2013 || Kitt Peak || Spacewatch || — || align=right | 3.6 km || 
|-id=831 bgcolor=#d6d6d6
| 451831 ||  || — || November 10, 2010 || Mount Lemmon || Mount Lemmon Survey || — || align=right | 3.4 km || 
|-id=832 bgcolor=#d6d6d6
| 451832 ||  || — || May 4, 2013 || Mount Lemmon || Mount Lemmon Survey || — || align=right | 3.1 km || 
|-id=833 bgcolor=#d6d6d6
| 451833 ||  || — || December 13, 2010 || Mount Lemmon || Mount Lemmon Survey || — || align=right | 3.0 km || 
|-id=834 bgcolor=#E9E9E9
| 451834 ||  || — || November 17, 2001 || Kitt Peak || Spacewatch || — || align=right | 2.2 km || 
|-id=835 bgcolor=#E9E9E9
| 451835 ||  || — || February 6, 2000 || Socorro || LINEAR || — || align=right | 1.1 km || 
|-id=836 bgcolor=#E9E9E9
| 451836 ||  || — || October 24, 2011 || Mount Lemmon || Mount Lemmon Survey || — || align=right | 1.3 km || 
|-id=837 bgcolor=#E9E9E9
| 451837 ||  || — || January 28, 2003 || Socorro || LINEAR || — || align=right | 2.1 km || 
|-id=838 bgcolor=#d6d6d6
| 451838 ||  || — || January 28, 2007 || Kitt Peak || Spacewatch || — || align=right | 3.2 km || 
|-id=839 bgcolor=#d6d6d6
| 451839 ||  || — || April 13, 2013 || Kitt Peak || Spacewatch || — || align=right | 3.2 km || 
|-id=840 bgcolor=#d6d6d6
| 451840 ||  || — || December 2, 2010 || Kitt Peak || Spacewatch || — || align=right | 3.1 km || 
|-id=841 bgcolor=#E9E9E9
| 451841 ||  || — || August 29, 2006 || Kitt Peak || Spacewatch || — || align=right | 1.4 km || 
|-id=842 bgcolor=#d6d6d6
| 451842 ||  || — || September 16, 2009 || Mount Lemmon || Mount Lemmon Survey || — || align=right | 2.9 km || 
|-id=843 bgcolor=#E9E9E9
| 451843 ||  || — || May 15, 2004 || Socorro || LINEAR || — || align=right | 2.6 km || 
|-id=844 bgcolor=#E9E9E9
| 451844 ||  || — || November 12, 2006 || Mount Lemmon || Mount Lemmon Survey || — || align=right | 2.1 km || 
|-id=845 bgcolor=#d6d6d6
| 451845 ||  || — || November 30, 2010 || Mount Lemmon || Mount Lemmon Survey || EOS || align=right | 2.1 km || 
|-id=846 bgcolor=#d6d6d6
| 451846 ||  || — || March 25, 2007 || Mount Lemmon || Mount Lemmon Survey || — || align=right | 3.1 km || 
|-id=847 bgcolor=#d6d6d6
| 451847 ||  || — || December 4, 2010 || Mount Lemmon || Mount Lemmon Survey || EOS || align=right | 2.4 km || 
|-id=848 bgcolor=#E9E9E9
| 451848 ||  || — || October 16, 2006 || Kitt Peak || Spacewatch || — || align=right | 1.9 km || 
|-id=849 bgcolor=#d6d6d6
| 451849 ||  || — || March 26, 2007 || Kitt Peak || Spacewatch || — || align=right | 2.9 km || 
|-id=850 bgcolor=#fefefe
| 451850 ||  || — || February 20, 2009 || Siding Spring || SSS || H || align=right data-sort-value="0.95" | 950 m || 
|-id=851 bgcolor=#fefefe
| 451851 ||  || — || January 10, 2007 || Kitt Peak || Spacewatch || — || align=right data-sort-value="0.94" | 940 m || 
|-id=852 bgcolor=#fefefe
| 451852 ||  || — || January 26, 2006 || Catalina || CSS || H || align=right data-sort-value="0.94" | 940 m || 
|-id=853 bgcolor=#fefefe
| 451853 ||  || — || February 24, 2006 || Kitt Peak || Spacewatch || H || align=right data-sort-value="0.82" | 820 m || 
|-id=854 bgcolor=#E9E9E9
| 451854 ||  || — || August 18, 2006 || Kitt Peak || Spacewatch || GEF || align=right | 1.5 km || 
|-id=855 bgcolor=#fefefe
| 451855 ||  || — || April 23, 2001 || Prescott || P. G. Comba || — || align=right data-sort-value="0.83" | 830 m || 
|-id=856 bgcolor=#fefefe
| 451856 ||  || — || September 8, 2004 || Campo Imperatore || CINEOS || — || align=right data-sort-value="0.85" | 850 m || 
|-id=857 bgcolor=#fefefe
| 451857 ||  || — || September 10, 2010 || Kitt Peak || Spacewatch || H || align=right data-sort-value="0.51" | 510 m || 
|-id=858 bgcolor=#fefefe
| 451858 ||  || — || May 9, 2000 || Kitt Peak || Spacewatch || — || align=right data-sort-value="0.62" | 620 m || 
|-id=859 bgcolor=#fefefe
| 451859 ||  || — || September 12, 2004 || Socorro || LINEAR || — || align=right | 1.0 km || 
|-id=860 bgcolor=#fefefe
| 451860 ||  || — || October 6, 2008 || Mount Lemmon || Mount Lemmon Survey || BAP || align=right | 1.1 km || 
|-id=861 bgcolor=#fefefe
| 451861 ||  || — || April 25, 2006 || Kitt Peak || Spacewatch || H || align=right data-sort-value="0.63" | 630 m || 
|-id=862 bgcolor=#fefefe
| 451862 ||  || — || April 23, 2007 || Kitt Peak || Spacewatch || — || align=right data-sort-value="0.78" | 780 m || 
|-id=863 bgcolor=#E9E9E9
| 451863 ||  || — || April 4, 2005 || Catalina || CSS || critical || align=right | 1.2 km || 
|-id=864 bgcolor=#fefefe
| 451864 ||  || — || December 4, 2007 || Catalina || CSS || H || align=right data-sort-value="0.51" | 510 m || 
|-id=865 bgcolor=#fefefe
| 451865 ||  || — || December 6, 2012 || Mount Lemmon || Mount Lemmon Survey || — || align=right data-sort-value="0.67" | 670 m || 
|-id=866 bgcolor=#fefefe
| 451866 ||  || — || September 3, 2007 || Catalina || CSS || — || align=right data-sort-value="0.71" | 710 m || 
|-id=867 bgcolor=#fefefe
| 451867 ||  || — || September 18, 1995 || Kitt Peak || Spacewatch || — || align=right data-sort-value="0.80" | 800 m || 
|-id=868 bgcolor=#E9E9E9
| 451868 ||  || — || June 20, 2006 || Mount Lemmon || Mount Lemmon Survey || MIS || align=right | 2.9 km || 
|-id=869 bgcolor=#fefefe
| 451869 ||  || — || March 10, 2007 || Mount Lemmon || Mount Lemmon Survey || — || align=right data-sort-value="0.57" | 570 m || 
|-id=870 bgcolor=#fefefe
| 451870 ||  || — || July 30, 2008 || Kitt Peak || Spacewatch || — || align=right data-sort-value="0.61" | 610 m || 
|-id=871 bgcolor=#fefefe
| 451871 ||  || — || May 7, 2007 || Kitt Peak || Spacewatch || — || align=right data-sort-value="0.82" | 820 m || 
|-id=872 bgcolor=#E9E9E9
| 451872 ||  || — || October 12, 2007 || Mount Lemmon || Mount Lemmon Survey || — || align=right data-sort-value="0.89" | 890 m || 
|-id=873 bgcolor=#fefefe
| 451873 ||  || — || March 28, 2014 || Mount Lemmon || Mount Lemmon Survey || — || align=right data-sort-value="0.91" | 910 m || 
|-id=874 bgcolor=#fefefe
| 451874 ||  || — || March 9, 2007 || Kitt Peak || Spacewatch || — || align=right data-sort-value="0.67" | 670 m || 
|-id=875 bgcolor=#fefefe
| 451875 ||  || — || August 10, 2007 || Kitt Peak || Spacewatch || NYS || align=right data-sort-value="0.67" | 670 m || 
|-id=876 bgcolor=#E9E9E9
| 451876 ||  || — || April 15, 2010 || Kitt Peak || Spacewatch || (194) || align=right | 1.2 km || 
|-id=877 bgcolor=#fefefe
| 451877 ||  || — || September 21, 2011 || Mount Lemmon || Mount Lemmon Survey || MAS || align=right data-sort-value="0.74" | 740 m || 
|-id=878 bgcolor=#fefefe
| 451878 ||  || — || August 30, 2005 || Kitt Peak || Spacewatch || — || align=right data-sort-value="0.67" | 670 m || 
|-id=879 bgcolor=#d6d6d6
| 451879 ||  || — || October 13, 2010 || Kitt Peak || Spacewatch || — || align=right | 2.1 km || 
|-id=880 bgcolor=#fefefe
| 451880 ||  || — || September 10, 2007 || Mount Lemmon || Mount Lemmon Survey || NYS || align=right data-sort-value="0.58" | 580 m || 
|-id=881 bgcolor=#fefefe
| 451881 ||  || — || February 2, 2006 || Mount Lemmon || Mount Lemmon Survey || NYS || align=right data-sort-value="0.69" | 690 m || 
|-id=882 bgcolor=#fefefe
| 451882 ||  || — || April 20, 2007 || Kitt Peak || Spacewatch || — || align=right data-sort-value="0.86" | 860 m || 
|-id=883 bgcolor=#fefefe
| 451883 ||  || — || January 2, 2009 || Mount Lemmon || Mount Lemmon Survey || — || align=right data-sort-value="0.90" | 900 m || 
|-id=884 bgcolor=#fefefe
| 451884 ||  || — || September 14, 2005 || Kitt Peak || Spacewatch || — || align=right data-sort-value="0.57" | 570 m || 
|-id=885 bgcolor=#fefefe
| 451885 ||  || — || December 21, 2012 || Mount Lemmon || Mount Lemmon Survey || — || align=right data-sort-value="0.89" | 890 m || 
|-id=886 bgcolor=#fefefe
| 451886 ||  || — || February 17, 2010 || Mount Lemmon || Mount Lemmon Survey || — || align=right data-sort-value="0.78" | 780 m || 
|-id=887 bgcolor=#E9E9E9
| 451887 ||  || — || October 20, 2011 || Mount Lemmon || Mount Lemmon Survey || — || align=right data-sort-value="0.98" | 980 m || 
|-id=888 bgcolor=#fefefe
| 451888 ||  || — || April 24, 2009 || Kitt Peak || Spacewatch || H || align=right data-sort-value="0.54" | 540 m || 
|-id=889 bgcolor=#fefefe
| 451889 ||  || — || March 14, 2007 || Kitt Peak || Spacewatch || — || align=right data-sort-value="0.66" | 660 m || 
|-id=890 bgcolor=#fefefe
| 451890 ||  || — || February 17, 2010 || Kitt Peak || Spacewatch || NYS || align=right data-sort-value="0.65" | 650 m || 
|-id=891 bgcolor=#fefefe
| 451891 ||  || — || May 3, 1997 || Kitt Peak || Spacewatch || — || align=right data-sort-value="0.71" | 710 m || 
|-id=892 bgcolor=#fefefe
| 451892 ||  || — || November 20, 2009 || Mount Lemmon || Mount Lemmon Survey || — || align=right data-sort-value="0.71" | 710 m || 
|-id=893 bgcolor=#E9E9E9
| 451893 ||  || — || September 17, 2006 || Kitt Peak || Spacewatch || — || align=right | 1.4 km || 
|-id=894 bgcolor=#fefefe
| 451894 ||  || — || May 11, 2007 || Mount Lemmon || Mount Lemmon Survey || V || align=right data-sort-value="0.53" | 530 m || 
|-id=895 bgcolor=#fefefe
| 451895 ||  || — || April 25, 2003 || Kitt Peak || Spacewatch || MAS || align=right data-sort-value="0.78" | 780 m || 
|-id=896 bgcolor=#FA8072
| 451896 ||  || — || October 7, 2004 || Siding Spring || SSS || — || align=right | 1.2 km || 
|-id=897 bgcolor=#fefefe
| 451897 ||  || — || October 18, 1999 || Kitt Peak || Spacewatch || H || align=right data-sort-value="0.77" | 770 m || 
|-id=898 bgcolor=#E9E9E9
| 451898 ||  || — || April 20, 2010 || Mount Lemmon || Mount Lemmon Survey || — || align=right | 1.1 km || 
|-id=899 bgcolor=#E9E9E9
| 451899 ||  || — || June 14, 2010 || Mount Lemmon || Mount Lemmon Survey || — || align=right | 1.4 km || 
|-id=900 bgcolor=#fefefe
| 451900 ||  || — || November 7, 2008 || Mount Lemmon || Mount Lemmon Survey || — || align=right data-sort-value="0.98" | 980 m || 
|}

451901–452000 

|-bgcolor=#fefefe
| 451901 ||  || — || April 16, 2001 || Kitt Peak || Spacewatch || — || align=right data-sort-value="0.62" | 620 m || 
|-id=902 bgcolor=#fefefe
| 451902 ||  || — || August 31, 2005 || Kitt Peak || Spacewatch || — || align=right data-sort-value="0.62" | 620 m || 
|-id=903 bgcolor=#fefefe
| 451903 ||  || — || November 24, 2008 || Kitt Peak || Spacewatch || — || align=right data-sort-value="0.68" | 680 m || 
|-id=904 bgcolor=#fefefe
| 451904 ||  || — || September 9, 2011 || Kitt Peak || Spacewatch || MAS || align=right data-sort-value="0.74" | 740 m || 
|-id=905 bgcolor=#fefefe
| 451905 ||  || — || September 10, 2007 || Mount Lemmon || Mount Lemmon Survey || MAS || align=right data-sort-value="0.66" | 660 m || 
|-id=906 bgcolor=#fefefe
| 451906 ||  || — || January 7, 2013 || Mount Lemmon || Mount Lemmon Survey || — || align=right data-sort-value="0.78" | 780 m || 
|-id=907 bgcolor=#E9E9E9
| 451907 ||  || — || June 17, 2010 || Mount Lemmon || Mount Lemmon Survey || — || align=right data-sort-value="0.94" | 940 m || 
|-id=908 bgcolor=#fefefe
| 451908 ||  || — || February 10, 2011 || Catalina || CSS || H || align=right data-sort-value="0.56" | 560 m || 
|-id=909 bgcolor=#E9E9E9
| 451909 ||  || — || October 20, 2011 || Mount Lemmon || Mount Lemmon Survey || — || align=right | 1.8 km || 
|-id=910 bgcolor=#fefefe
| 451910 ||  || — || April 14, 2010 || Kitt Peak || Spacewatch || — || align=right data-sort-value="0.82" | 820 m || 
|-id=911 bgcolor=#fefefe
| 451911 ||  || — || May 31, 2010 || WISE || WISE || — || align=right | 2.2 km || 
|-id=912 bgcolor=#fefefe
| 451912 ||  || — || June 4, 2011 || Mount Lemmon || Mount Lemmon Survey || — || align=right data-sort-value="0.81" | 810 m || 
|-id=913 bgcolor=#E9E9E9
| 451913 ||  || — || January 11, 2008 || Kitt Peak || Spacewatch ||  || align=right | 2.5 km || 
|-id=914 bgcolor=#E9E9E9
| 451914 ||  || — || June 15, 2010 || Siding Spring || SSS || — || align=right | 2.4 km || 
|-id=915 bgcolor=#E9E9E9
| 451915 ||  || — || May 2, 2014 || Mount Lemmon || Mount Lemmon Survey || — || align=right | 2.2 km || 
|-id=916 bgcolor=#fefefe
| 451916 ||  || — || September 29, 2003 || Kitt Peak || Spacewatch || — || align=right data-sort-value="0.60" | 600 m || 
|-id=917 bgcolor=#d6d6d6
| 451917 ||  || — || November 3, 2005 || Mount Lemmon || Mount Lemmon Survey || — || align=right | 3.0 km || 
|-id=918 bgcolor=#fefefe
| 451918 ||  || — || February 17, 2010 || Kitt Peak || Spacewatch || NYS || align=right data-sort-value="0.58" | 580 m || 
|-id=919 bgcolor=#fefefe
| 451919 ||  || — || March 21, 2010 || Kitt Peak || Spacewatch || MAS || align=right data-sort-value="0.73" | 730 m || 
|-id=920 bgcolor=#fefefe
| 451920 ||  || — || March 20, 2010 || Kitt Peak || Spacewatch || — || align=right data-sort-value="0.94" | 940 m || 
|-id=921 bgcolor=#fefefe
| 451921 ||  || — || January 13, 2003 || Socorro || LINEAR || H || align=right data-sort-value="0.91" | 910 m || 
|-id=922 bgcolor=#fefefe
| 451922 ||  || — || March 12, 2007 || Catalina || CSS || — || align=right data-sort-value="0.82" | 820 m || 
|-id=923 bgcolor=#fefefe
| 451923 ||  || — || January 4, 2013 || Mount Lemmon || Mount Lemmon Survey || — || align=right data-sort-value="0.87" | 870 m || 
|-id=924 bgcolor=#fefefe
| 451924 ||  || — || October 24, 2011 || Mount Lemmon || Mount Lemmon Survey || NYS || align=right data-sort-value="0.72" | 720 m || 
|-id=925 bgcolor=#E9E9E9
| 451925 ||  || — || June 19, 2010 || Mount Lemmon || Mount Lemmon Survey || — || align=right | 1.4 km || 
|-id=926 bgcolor=#d6d6d6
| 451926 ||  || — || October 22, 2009 || Catalina || CSS || — || align=right | 4.1 km || 
|-id=927 bgcolor=#E9E9E9
| 451927 ||  || — || November 27, 2006 || Kitt Peak || Spacewatch || — || align=right | 2.2 km || 
|-id=928 bgcolor=#fefefe
| 451928 ||  || — || September 22, 2011 || Kitt Peak || Spacewatch || — || align=right data-sort-value="0.98" | 980 m || 
|-id=929 bgcolor=#fefefe
| 451929 ||  || — || March 11, 2007 || Catalina || CSS || — || align=right | 2.2 km || 
|-id=930 bgcolor=#E9E9E9
| 451930 ||  || — || December 18, 2007 || Mount Lemmon || Mount Lemmon Survey || — || align=right data-sort-value="0.97" | 970 m || 
|-id=931 bgcolor=#fefefe
| 451931 ||  || — || April 22, 1996 || Kitt Peak || Spacewatch || — || align=right data-sort-value="0.86" | 860 m || 
|-id=932 bgcolor=#fefefe
| 451932 ||  || — || January 6, 2013 || Mount Lemmon || Mount Lemmon Survey || — || align=right | 1.0 km || 
|-id=933 bgcolor=#fefefe
| 451933 ||  || — || September 10, 2007 || Mount Lemmon || Mount Lemmon Survey || — || align=right data-sort-value="0.87" | 870 m || 
|-id=934 bgcolor=#fefefe
| 451934 ||  || — || April 11, 2007 || Kitt Peak || Spacewatch || — || align=right data-sort-value="0.72" | 720 m || 
|-id=935 bgcolor=#E9E9E9
| 451935 ||  || — || February 20, 2009 || Mount Lemmon || Mount Lemmon Survey || KON || align=right | 2.6 km || 
|-id=936 bgcolor=#E9E9E9
| 451936 ||  || — || October 3, 2003 || Kitt Peak || Spacewatch || — || align=right | 1.2 km || 
|-id=937 bgcolor=#fefefe
| 451937 ||  || — || December 24, 2005 || Kitt Peak || Spacewatch || — || align=right | 2.2 km || 
|-id=938 bgcolor=#E9E9E9
| 451938 ||  || — || April 2, 2010 || WISE || WISE || — || align=right | 1.2 km || 
|-id=939 bgcolor=#fefefe
| 451939 ||  || — || July 28, 2011 || Siding Spring || SSS || — || align=right data-sort-value="0.87" | 870 m || 
|-id=940 bgcolor=#E9E9E9
| 451940 ||  || — || September 4, 2010 || Socorro || LINEAR || — || align=right | 1.5 km || 
|-id=941 bgcolor=#fefefe
| 451941 ||  || — || September 12, 2007 || Catalina || CSS || — || align=right data-sort-value="0.82" | 820 m || 
|-id=942 bgcolor=#d6d6d6
| 451942 ||  || — || October 19, 2010 || Mount Lemmon || Mount Lemmon Survey || BRA || align=right | 1.6 km || 
|-id=943 bgcolor=#fefefe
| 451943 ||  || — || December 22, 2008 || Kitt Peak || Spacewatch || — || align=right data-sort-value="0.86" | 860 m || 
|-id=944 bgcolor=#E9E9E9
| 451944 ||  || — || May 8, 2005 || Kitt Peak || Spacewatch || — || align=right | 1.4 km || 
|-id=945 bgcolor=#E9E9E9
| 451945 ||  || — || March 13, 2010 || WISE || WISE || — || align=right | 2.7 km || 
|-id=946 bgcolor=#fefefe
| 451946 ||  || — || September 12, 2007 || Mount Lemmon || Mount Lemmon Survey || MAS || align=right data-sort-value="0.93" | 930 m || 
|-id=947 bgcolor=#d6d6d6
| 451947 ||  || — || October 19, 2010 || Mount Lemmon || Mount Lemmon Survey || — || align=right | 2.5 km || 
|-id=948 bgcolor=#d6d6d6
| 451948 ||  || — || May 27, 2009 || Mount Lemmon || Mount Lemmon Survey || — || align=right | 2.2 km || 
|-id=949 bgcolor=#E9E9E9
| 451949 ||  || — || May 25, 2009 || Kitt Peak || Spacewatch || — || align=right | 2.2 km || 
|-id=950 bgcolor=#E9E9E9
| 451950 ||  || — || January 13, 1996 || Kitt Peak || Spacewatch || (5) || align=right | 1.1 km || 
|-id=951 bgcolor=#d6d6d6
| 451951 ||  || — || October 30, 2010 || Kitt Peak || Spacewatch || — || align=right | 2.9 km || 
|-id=952 bgcolor=#d6d6d6
| 451952 ||  || — || January 13, 2010 || WISE || WISE || — || align=right | 3.9 km || 
|-id=953 bgcolor=#d6d6d6
| 451953 ||  || — || September 24, 2009 || Mount Lemmon || Mount Lemmon Survey || EOS || align=right | 2.2 km || 
|-id=954 bgcolor=#d6d6d6
| 451954 ||  || — || September 22, 2009 || Catalina || CSS || EOS || align=right | 2.3 km || 
|-id=955 bgcolor=#E9E9E9
| 451955 ||  || — || May 8, 2014 || Mount Lemmon || Mount Lemmon Survey || — || align=right | 1.5 km || 
|-id=956 bgcolor=#d6d6d6
| 451956 ||  || — || October 21, 2006 || Mount Lemmon || Mount Lemmon Survey || BRA || align=right | 1.8 km || 
|-id=957 bgcolor=#d6d6d6
| 451957 ||  || — || November 15, 2009 || Siding Spring || SSS || Tj (2.99) || align=right | 3.8 km || 
|-id=958 bgcolor=#d6d6d6
| 451958 ||  || — || August 27, 2009 || Kitt Peak || Spacewatch || EOS || align=right | 2.4 km || 
|-id=959 bgcolor=#d6d6d6
| 451959 ||  || — || December 3, 2010 || Mount Lemmon || Mount Lemmon Survey || — || align=right | 2.6 km || 
|-id=960 bgcolor=#d6d6d6
| 451960 ||  || — || December 10, 2005 || Kitt Peak || Spacewatch || — || align=right | 3.5 km || 
|-id=961 bgcolor=#fefefe
| 451961 ||  || — || March 3, 2006 || Kitt Peak || Spacewatch || — || align=right data-sort-value="0.74" | 740 m || 
|-id=962 bgcolor=#d6d6d6
| 451962 ||  || — || January 21, 2012 || Catalina || CSS || — || align=right | 3.9 km || 
|-id=963 bgcolor=#E9E9E9
| 451963 ||  || — || January 4, 2012 || Mount Lemmon || Mount Lemmon Survey || — || align=right | 2.1 km || 
|-id=964 bgcolor=#E9E9E9
| 451964 ||  || — || August 10, 2010 || Kitt Peak || Spacewatch || DOR || align=right | 2.5 km || 
|-id=965 bgcolor=#d6d6d6
| 451965 ||  || — || September 30, 2010 || Mount Lemmon || Mount Lemmon Survey || KOR || align=right | 1.1 km || 
|-id=966 bgcolor=#d6d6d6
| 451966 ||  || — || January 28, 2010 || WISE || WISE || — || align=right | 2.9 km || 
|-id=967 bgcolor=#E9E9E9
| 451967 ||  || — || February 29, 2000 || Socorro || LINEAR || — || align=right | 2.4 km || 
|-id=968 bgcolor=#d6d6d6
| 451968 ||  || — || May 24, 2014 || Mount Lemmon || Mount Lemmon Survey || — || align=right | 3.5 km || 
|-id=969 bgcolor=#d6d6d6
| 451969 ||  || — || January 27, 2007 || Kitt Peak || Spacewatch || — || align=right | 4.1 km || 
|-id=970 bgcolor=#E9E9E9
| 451970 ||  || — || November 20, 2003 || Kitt Peak || Spacewatch || — || align=right | 1.1 km || 
|-id=971 bgcolor=#E9E9E9
| 451971 ||  || — || November 19, 2006 || Kitt Peak || Spacewatch || HOF || align=right | 2.5 km || 
|-id=972 bgcolor=#d6d6d6
| 451972 ||  || — || June 16, 2009 || Mount Lemmon || Mount Lemmon Survey || EOS || align=right | 2.1 km || 
|-id=973 bgcolor=#d6d6d6
| 451973 ||  || — || December 14, 2010 || Mount Lemmon || Mount Lemmon Survey || — || align=right | 2.0 km || 
|-id=974 bgcolor=#d6d6d6
| 451974 ||  || — || January 31, 2006 || Mount Lemmon || Mount Lemmon Survey || — || align=right | 2.5 km || 
|-id=975 bgcolor=#d6d6d6
| 451975 ||  || — || March 14, 2007 || Kitt Peak || Spacewatch || EOS || align=right | 2.4 km || 
|-id=976 bgcolor=#d6d6d6
| 451976 ||  || — || March 14, 2012 || Mount Lemmon || Mount Lemmon Survey || — || align=right | 3.2 km || 
|-id=977 bgcolor=#E9E9E9
| 451977 ||  || — || October 2, 2006 || Mount Lemmon || Mount Lemmon Survey || — || align=right | 1.7 km || 
|-id=978 bgcolor=#E9E9E9
| 451978 ||  || — || November 1, 2007 || Kitt Peak || Spacewatch || — || align=right | 1.2 km || 
|-id=979 bgcolor=#d6d6d6
| 451979 ||  || — || May 8, 2008 || Mount Lemmon || Mount Lemmon Survey || — || align=right | 2.5 km || 
|-id=980 bgcolor=#d6d6d6
| 451980 ||  || — || March 15, 2012 || Mount Lemmon || Mount Lemmon Survey || EOS || align=right | 1.9 km || 
|-id=981 bgcolor=#d6d6d6
| 451981 ||  || — || November 8, 2010 || Mount Lemmon || Mount Lemmon Survey || — || align=right | 2.9 km || 
|-id=982 bgcolor=#d6d6d6
| 451982 ||  || — || August 16, 2009 || Kitt Peak || Spacewatch || EOS || align=right | 2.6 km || 
|-id=983 bgcolor=#d6d6d6
| 451983 ||  || — || April 22, 2007 || Catalina || CSS || — || align=right | 4.5 km || 
|-id=984 bgcolor=#d6d6d6
| 451984 ||  || — || April 10, 2013 || Mount Lemmon || Mount Lemmon Survey || — || align=right | 2.8 km || 
|-id=985 bgcolor=#E9E9E9
| 451985 ||  || — || May 15, 2005 || Mount Lemmon || Mount Lemmon Survey || (5) || align=right data-sort-value="0.89" | 890 m || 
|-id=986 bgcolor=#E9E9E9
| 451986 ||  || — || October 1, 2006 || Kitt Peak || Spacewatch || — || align=right | 1.6 km || 
|-id=987 bgcolor=#E9E9E9
| 451987 ||  || — || February 4, 2009 || Mount Lemmon || Mount Lemmon Survey || — || align=right | 1.5 km || 
|-id=988 bgcolor=#d6d6d6
| 451988 ||  || — || December 10, 2005 || Kitt Peak || Spacewatch || — || align=right | 2.6 km || 
|-id=989 bgcolor=#E9E9E9
| 451989 ||  || — || October 12, 2010 || Mount Lemmon || Mount Lemmon Survey || — || align=right | 2.2 km || 
|-id=990 bgcolor=#E9E9E9
| 451990 ||  || — || February 7, 2008 || Kitt Peak || Spacewatch || — || align=right | 2.4 km || 
|-id=991 bgcolor=#d6d6d6
| 451991 ||  || — || September 14, 2007 || Anderson Mesa || LONEOS || 3:2 || align=right | 4.5 km || 
|-id=992 bgcolor=#d6d6d6
| 451992 ||  || — || March 5, 2008 || Kitt Peak || Spacewatch || KOR || align=right | 1.2 km || 
|-id=993 bgcolor=#E9E9E9
| 451993 ||  || — || November 5, 2007 || Mount Lemmon || Mount Lemmon Survey || — || align=right data-sort-value="0.83" | 830 m || 
|-id=994 bgcolor=#d6d6d6
| 451994 ||  || — || March 13, 2013 || Kitt Peak || Spacewatch || — || align=right | 2.2 km || 
|-id=995 bgcolor=#d6d6d6
| 451995 ||  || — || December 30, 2005 || Kitt Peak || Spacewatch || — || align=right | 2.7 km || 
|-id=996 bgcolor=#d6d6d6
| 451996 ||  || — || January 27, 2006 || Kitt Peak || Spacewatch || — || align=right | 2.8 km || 
|-id=997 bgcolor=#d6d6d6
| 451997 ||  || — || February 7, 2006 || Kitt Peak || Spacewatch || — || align=right | 4.1 km || 
|-id=998 bgcolor=#E9E9E9
| 451998 ||  || — || February 17, 2013 || Kitt Peak || Spacewatch || — || align=right data-sort-value="0.88" | 880 m || 
|-id=999 bgcolor=#d6d6d6
| 451999 ||  || — || October 5, 2004 || Kitt Peak || Spacewatch || — || align=right | 2.7 km || 
|-id=000 bgcolor=#d6d6d6
| 452000 ||  || — || December 25, 2005 || Kitt Peak || Spacewatch || — || align=right | 2.0 km || 
|}

References

External links 
 Discovery Circumstances: Numbered Minor Planets (450001)–(455000) (IAU Minor Planet Center)

0451